

230001–230100 

|-bgcolor=#fefefe
| 230001 ||  || — || February 29, 2000 || Socorro || LINEAR || NYS || align=right | 2.1 km || 
|-id=002 bgcolor=#fefefe
| 230002 ||  || — || February 29, 2000 || Socorro || LINEAR || V || align=right data-sort-value="0.95" | 950 m || 
|-id=003 bgcolor=#d6d6d6
| 230003 ||  || — || February 29, 2000 || Socorro || LINEAR || THB || align=right | 4.5 km || 
|-id=004 bgcolor=#fefefe
| 230004 ||  || — || February 29, 2000 || Socorro || LINEAR || — || align=right | 1.3 km || 
|-id=005 bgcolor=#fefefe
| 230005 ||  || — || February 29, 2000 || Socorro || LINEAR || V || align=right | 1.2 km || 
|-id=006 bgcolor=#d6d6d6
| 230006 ||  || — || February 29, 2000 || Socorro || LINEAR || — || align=right | 4.7 km || 
|-id=007 bgcolor=#fefefe
| 230007 ||  || — || March 5, 2000 || Socorro || LINEAR || — || align=right | 1.4 km || 
|-id=008 bgcolor=#d6d6d6
| 230008 ||  || — || March 9, 2000 || Socorro || LINEAR || — || align=right | 5.6 km || 
|-id=009 bgcolor=#d6d6d6
| 230009 ||  || — || March 14, 2000 || Kitt Peak || Spacewatch || — || align=right | 3.8 km || 
|-id=010 bgcolor=#fefefe
| 230010 ||  || — || March 29, 2000 || Socorro || LINEAR || — || align=right | 1.4 km || 
|-id=011 bgcolor=#fefefe
| 230011 ||  || — || March 29, 2000 || Socorro || LINEAR || — || align=right | 1.6 km || 
|-id=012 bgcolor=#fefefe
| 230012 ||  || — || March 29, 2000 || Socorro || LINEAR || NYS || align=right | 1.9 km || 
|-id=013 bgcolor=#fefefe
| 230013 ||  || — || April 5, 2000 || Socorro || LINEAR || NYS || align=right data-sort-value="0.81" | 810 m || 
|-id=014 bgcolor=#fefefe
| 230014 ||  || — || April 5, 2000 || Socorro || LINEAR || V || align=right data-sort-value="0.93" | 930 m || 
|-id=015 bgcolor=#d6d6d6
| 230015 ||  || — || April 5, 2000 || Socorro || LINEAR || — || align=right | 4.5 km || 
|-id=016 bgcolor=#d6d6d6
| 230016 ||  || — || April 4, 2000 || Socorro || LINEAR || — || align=right | 5.3 km || 
|-id=017 bgcolor=#d6d6d6
| 230017 ||  || — || April 13, 2000 || Haleakala || NEAT || TIR || align=right | 5.4 km || 
|-id=018 bgcolor=#fefefe
| 230018 ||  || — || April 27, 2000 || Socorro || LINEAR || MAS || align=right | 1.4 km || 
|-id=019 bgcolor=#E9E9E9
| 230019 ||  || — || April 24, 2000 || Kitt Peak || Spacewatch || — || align=right | 2.8 km || 
|-id=020 bgcolor=#fefefe
| 230020 ||  || — || April 30, 2000 || Socorro || LINEAR || V || align=right data-sort-value="0.98" | 980 m || 
|-id=021 bgcolor=#fefefe
| 230021 ||  || — || April 28, 2000 || Anderson Mesa || LONEOS || — || align=right | 1.5 km || 
|-id=022 bgcolor=#d6d6d6
| 230022 ||  || — || April 25, 2000 || Kitt Peak || Spacewatch || HYG || align=right | 4.0 km || 
|-id=023 bgcolor=#fefefe
| 230023 ||  || — || May 4, 2000 || Socorro || LINEAR || H || align=right data-sort-value="0.80" | 800 m || 
|-id=024 bgcolor=#d6d6d6
| 230024 ||  || — || May 3, 2000 || Socorro || LINEAR || TIR || align=right | 3.4 km || 
|-id=025 bgcolor=#fefefe
| 230025 ||  || — || May 6, 2000 || Socorro || LINEAR || — || align=right | 1.2 km || 
|-id=026 bgcolor=#d6d6d6
| 230026 ||  || — || May 1, 2000 || Anderson Mesa || LONEOS || — || align=right | 2.8 km || 
|-id=027 bgcolor=#fefefe
| 230027 ||  || — || May 27, 2000 || Socorro || LINEAR || ERI || align=right | 2.3 km || 
|-id=028 bgcolor=#fefefe
| 230028 ||  || — || May 29, 2000 || Anderson Mesa || LONEOS || H || align=right data-sort-value="0.73" | 730 m || 
|-id=029 bgcolor=#fefefe
| 230029 ||  || — || May 25, 2000 || Anderson Mesa || LONEOS || — || align=right | 1.5 km || 
|-id=030 bgcolor=#fefefe
| 230030 ||  || — || July 29, 2000 || Anderson Mesa || LONEOS || — || align=right | 1.3 km || 
|-id=031 bgcolor=#fefefe
| 230031 || 2000 PG || — || August 1, 2000 || Socorro || LINEAR || H || align=right data-sort-value="0.89" | 890 m || 
|-id=032 bgcolor=#E9E9E9
| 230032 ||  || — || August 24, 2000 || Socorro || LINEAR || — || align=right | 3.4 km || 
|-id=033 bgcolor=#E9E9E9
| 230033 ||  || — || August 24, 2000 || Socorro || LINEAR || — || align=right | 1.3 km || 
|-id=034 bgcolor=#E9E9E9
| 230034 ||  || — || August 24, 2000 || Socorro || LINEAR || — || align=right | 1.4 km || 
|-id=035 bgcolor=#E9E9E9
| 230035 ||  || — || August 26, 2000 || Socorro || LINEAR || — || align=right | 2.2 km || 
|-id=036 bgcolor=#fefefe
| 230036 ||  || — || August 24, 2000 || Socorro || LINEAR || V || align=right | 1.3 km || 
|-id=037 bgcolor=#E9E9E9
| 230037 ||  || — || August 25, 2000 || Socorro || LINEAR || MIT || align=right | 3.4 km || 
|-id=038 bgcolor=#E9E9E9
| 230038 ||  || — || August 28, 2000 || Socorro || LINEAR || — || align=right | 3.2 km || 
|-id=039 bgcolor=#E9E9E9
| 230039 ||  || — || August 31, 2000 || Socorro || LINEAR || MAR || align=right | 1.8 km || 
|-id=040 bgcolor=#E9E9E9
| 230040 ||  || — || August 31, 2000 || Socorro || LINEAR || — || align=right | 1.4 km || 
|-id=041 bgcolor=#fefefe
| 230041 ||  || — || August 31, 2000 || Socorro || LINEAR || — || align=right | 1.7 km || 
|-id=042 bgcolor=#E9E9E9
| 230042 ||  || — || August 31, 2000 || Socorro || LINEAR || — || align=right | 1.1 km || 
|-id=043 bgcolor=#E9E9E9
| 230043 ||  || — || August 31, 2000 || Socorro || LINEAR || — || align=right | 3.0 km || 
|-id=044 bgcolor=#E9E9E9
| 230044 ||  || — || September 6, 2000 || Socorro || LINEAR || — || align=right | 1.6 km || 
|-id=045 bgcolor=#E9E9E9
| 230045 ||  || — || September 23, 2000 || Socorro || LINEAR || — || align=right | 2.0 km || 
|-id=046 bgcolor=#E9E9E9
| 230046 ||  || — || September 24, 2000 || Socorro || LINEAR || — || align=right | 2.9 km || 
|-id=047 bgcolor=#E9E9E9
| 230047 ||  || — || September 24, 2000 || Socorro || LINEAR || — || align=right | 3.2 km || 
|-id=048 bgcolor=#E9E9E9
| 230048 ||  || — || September 23, 2000 || Socorro || LINEAR || — || align=right | 2.0 km || 
|-id=049 bgcolor=#E9E9E9
| 230049 ||  || — || September 24, 2000 || Socorro || LINEAR || — || align=right | 1.6 km || 
|-id=050 bgcolor=#E9E9E9
| 230050 ||  || — || September 24, 2000 || Socorro || LINEAR || ADE || align=right | 4.1 km || 
|-id=051 bgcolor=#E9E9E9
| 230051 ||  || — || September 24, 2000 || Socorro || LINEAR || — || align=right | 2.1 km || 
|-id=052 bgcolor=#E9E9E9
| 230052 ||  || — || September 22, 2000 || Socorro || LINEAR || MAR || align=right | 2.0 km || 
|-id=053 bgcolor=#E9E9E9
| 230053 ||  || — || September 23, 2000 || Socorro || LINEAR || JUN || align=right | 1.5 km || 
|-id=054 bgcolor=#E9E9E9
| 230054 ||  || — || September 24, 2000 || Socorro || LINEAR || — || align=right | 1.4 km || 
|-id=055 bgcolor=#E9E9E9
| 230055 ||  || — || September 24, 2000 || Socorro || LINEAR || — || align=right | 2.5 km || 
|-id=056 bgcolor=#E9E9E9
| 230056 ||  || — || September 20, 2000 || Kitt Peak || Spacewatch || — || align=right | 2.0 km || 
|-id=057 bgcolor=#E9E9E9
| 230057 ||  || — || September 20, 2000 || Kitt Peak || Spacewatch || — || align=right | 1.2 km || 
|-id=058 bgcolor=#E9E9E9
| 230058 ||  || — || September 24, 2000 || Socorro || LINEAR || MAR || align=right | 1.8 km || 
|-id=059 bgcolor=#E9E9E9
| 230059 ||  || — || September 24, 2000 || Socorro || LINEAR || — || align=right | 1.8 km || 
|-id=060 bgcolor=#E9E9E9
| 230060 ||  || — || September 26, 2000 || Socorro || LINEAR || — || align=right | 2.1 km || 
|-id=061 bgcolor=#E9E9E9
| 230061 ||  || — || September 26, 2000 || Socorro || LINEAR || ADE || align=right | 3.2 km || 
|-id=062 bgcolor=#E9E9E9
| 230062 ||  || — || September 26, 2000 || Socorro || LINEAR || — || align=right | 1.7 km || 
|-id=063 bgcolor=#E9E9E9
| 230063 ||  || — || September 29, 2000 || Anderson Mesa || LONEOS || — || align=right | 2.1 km || 
|-id=064 bgcolor=#E9E9E9
| 230064 ||  || — || September 30, 2000 || Anderson Mesa || LONEOS || — || align=right | 3.0 km || 
|-id=065 bgcolor=#E9E9E9
| 230065 ||  || — || October 1, 2000 || Socorro || LINEAR || — || align=right | 2.4 km || 
|-id=066 bgcolor=#E9E9E9
| 230066 ||  || — || October 2, 2000 || Anderson Mesa || LONEOS || — || align=right | 5.1 km || 
|-id=067 bgcolor=#E9E9E9
| 230067 ||  || — || October 1, 2000 || Apache Point || SDSS || — || align=right | 1.3 km || 
|-id=068 bgcolor=#E9E9E9
| 230068 || 2000 UM || — || October 30, 2000 || Socorro || LINEAR || — || align=right | 1.9 km || 
|-id=069 bgcolor=#E9E9E9
| 230069 ||  || — || October 29, 2000 || Socorro || LINEAR || — || align=right | 6.0 km || 
|-id=070 bgcolor=#E9E9E9
| 230070 ||  || — || October 31, 2000 || Socorro || LINEAR || HNS || align=right | 2.0 km || 
|-id=071 bgcolor=#E9E9E9
| 230071 ||  || — || October 24, 2000 || Socorro || LINEAR || — || align=right | 4.5 km || 
|-id=072 bgcolor=#E9E9E9
| 230072 ||  || — || October 25, 2000 || Socorro || LINEAR || — || align=right | 1.5 km || 
|-id=073 bgcolor=#E9E9E9
| 230073 ||  || — || October 25, 2000 || Socorro || LINEAR || — || align=right | 2.2 km || 
|-id=074 bgcolor=#E9E9E9
| 230074 ||  || — || October 29, 2000 || Socorro || LINEAR || — || align=right | 1.4 km || 
|-id=075 bgcolor=#E9E9E9
| 230075 ||  || — || October 25, 2000 || Socorro || LINEAR || JUN || align=right | 1.4 km || 
|-id=076 bgcolor=#E9E9E9
| 230076 ||  || — || October 26, 2000 || Kitt Peak || Spacewatch || — || align=right | 1.8 km || 
|-id=077 bgcolor=#E9E9E9
| 230077 ||  || — || November 1, 2000 || Socorro || LINEAR || HEN || align=right | 1.4 km || 
|-id=078 bgcolor=#E9E9E9
| 230078 ||  || — || November 3, 2000 || Socorro || LINEAR || — || align=right | 4.0 km || 
|-id=079 bgcolor=#E9E9E9
| 230079 ||  || — || November 17, 2000 || Kitt Peak || Spacewatch || — || align=right | 3.4 km || 
|-id=080 bgcolor=#E9E9E9
| 230080 ||  || — || November 20, 2000 || Junk Bond || J. Medkeff || — || align=right | 1.7 km || 
|-id=081 bgcolor=#E9E9E9
| 230081 ||  || — || November 20, 2000 || Socorro || LINEAR || — || align=right | 2.9 km || 
|-id=082 bgcolor=#E9E9E9
| 230082 ||  || — || November 21, 2000 || Socorro || LINEAR || — || align=right | 2.0 km || 
|-id=083 bgcolor=#E9E9E9
| 230083 ||  || — || November 27, 2000 || Kitt Peak || Spacewatch || — || align=right | 3.1 km || 
|-id=084 bgcolor=#E9E9E9
| 230084 ||  || — || November 21, 2000 || Socorro || LINEAR || — || align=right | 4.4 km || 
|-id=085 bgcolor=#E9E9E9
| 230085 ||  || — || November 20, 2000 || Socorro || LINEAR || — || align=right | 5.7 km || 
|-id=086 bgcolor=#E9E9E9
| 230086 ||  || — || November 20, 2000 || Anderson Mesa || LONEOS || — || align=right | 4.0 km || 
|-id=087 bgcolor=#E9E9E9
| 230087 ||  || — || November 19, 2000 || Socorro || LINEAR || — || align=right | 2.5 km || 
|-id=088 bgcolor=#E9E9E9
| 230088 ||  || — || November 21, 2000 || Socorro || LINEAR || — || align=right | 3.7 km || 
|-id=089 bgcolor=#FFC2E0
| 230089 ||  || — || November 30, 2000 || Socorro || LINEAR || APO || align=right data-sort-value="0.51" | 510 m || 
|-id=090 bgcolor=#E9E9E9
| 230090 ||  || — || November 30, 2000 || Socorro || LINEAR || — || align=right | 3.6 km || 
|-id=091 bgcolor=#E9E9E9
| 230091 ||  || — || December 1, 2000 || Socorro || LINEAR || — || align=right | 2.6 km || 
|-id=092 bgcolor=#E9E9E9
| 230092 ||  || — || December 1, 2000 || Socorro || LINEAR || — || align=right | 3.6 km || 
|-id=093 bgcolor=#E9E9E9
| 230093 ||  || — || December 4, 2000 || Socorro || LINEAR || JUN || align=right | 3.6 km || 
|-id=094 bgcolor=#E9E9E9
| 230094 ||  || — || December 4, 2000 || Socorro || LINEAR || JUN || align=right | 1.7 km || 
|-id=095 bgcolor=#E9E9E9
| 230095 ||  || — || December 5, 2000 || Socorro || LINEAR || JUN || align=right | 1.9 km || 
|-id=096 bgcolor=#E9E9E9
| 230096 ||  || — || December 15, 2000 || Socorro || LINEAR || BAR || align=right | 1.8 km || 
|-id=097 bgcolor=#E9E9E9
| 230097 ||  || — || December 22, 2000 || Kitt Peak || Spacewatch || — || align=right | 3.4 km || 
|-id=098 bgcolor=#E9E9E9
| 230098 ||  || — || December 30, 2000 || Socorro || LINEAR || WIT || align=right | 1.9 km || 
|-id=099 bgcolor=#E9E9E9
| 230099 ||  || — || December 30, 2000 || Socorro || LINEAR || — || align=right | 1.8 km || 
|-id=100 bgcolor=#E9E9E9
| 230100 ||  || — || December 30, 2000 || Socorro || LINEAR || — || align=right | 3.4 km || 
|}

230101–230200 

|-bgcolor=#E9E9E9
| 230101 ||  || — || December 30, 2000 || Socorro || LINEAR || — || align=right | 2.3 km || 
|-id=102 bgcolor=#E9E9E9
| 230102 ||  || — || December 30, 2000 || Socorro || LINEAR || — || align=right | 3.8 km || 
|-id=103 bgcolor=#E9E9E9
| 230103 ||  || — || December 28, 2000 || Socorro || LINEAR || — || align=right | 3.1 km || 
|-id=104 bgcolor=#E9E9E9
| 230104 ||  || — || December 18, 2000 || Anderson Mesa || LONEOS || — || align=right | 2.5 km || 
|-id=105 bgcolor=#E9E9E9
| 230105 ||  || — || December 23, 2000 || Apache Point || SDSS || — || align=right | 3.0 km || 
|-id=106 bgcolor=#E9E9E9
| 230106 ||  || — || January 2, 2001 || Socorro || LINEAR || EUN || align=right | 1.9 km || 
|-id=107 bgcolor=#E9E9E9
| 230107 ||  || — || January 3, 2001 || Socorro || LINEAR || — || align=right | 3.9 km || 
|-id=108 bgcolor=#E9E9E9
| 230108 ||  || — || January 4, 2001 || Socorro || LINEAR || — || align=right | 5.2 km || 
|-id=109 bgcolor=#E9E9E9
| 230109 ||  || — || January 5, 2001 || Socorro || LINEAR || — || align=right | 2.1 km || 
|-id=110 bgcolor=#E9E9E9
| 230110 ||  || — || January 5, 2001 || Socorro || LINEAR || ADE || align=right | 4.3 km || 
|-id=111 bgcolor=#FFC2E0
| 230111 ||  || — || January 18, 2001 || Socorro || LINEAR || ATEPHA || align=right data-sort-value="0.54" | 540 m || 
|-id=112 bgcolor=#E9E9E9
| 230112 ||  || — || January 18, 2001 || Kitt Peak || Spacewatch || NEM || align=right | 3.0 km || 
|-id=113 bgcolor=#E9E9E9
| 230113 ||  || — || January 29, 2001 || Socorro || LINEAR || — || align=right | 2.4 km || 
|-id=114 bgcolor=#E9E9E9
| 230114 ||  || — || January 29, 2001 || Socorro || LINEAR || NEM || align=right | 3.4 km || 
|-id=115 bgcolor=#E9E9E9
| 230115 ||  || — || January 26, 2001 || Socorro || LINEAR || — || align=right | 2.6 km || 
|-id=116 bgcolor=#E9E9E9
| 230116 ||  || — || February 15, 2001 || Socorro || LINEAR || — || align=right | 4.4 km || 
|-id=117 bgcolor=#fefefe
| 230117 ||  || — || February 16, 2001 || Socorro || LINEAR || — || align=right | 1.2 km || 
|-id=118 bgcolor=#FFC2E0
| 230118 ||  || — || February 16, 2001 || Socorro || LINEAR || AMO +1km || align=right | 1.2 km || 
|-id=119 bgcolor=#E9E9E9
| 230119 ||  || — || February 19, 2001 || Socorro || LINEAR || — || align=right | 4.2 km || 
|-id=120 bgcolor=#E9E9E9
| 230120 ||  || — || February 19, 2001 || Socorro || LINEAR || DOR || align=right | 4.8 km || 
|-id=121 bgcolor=#E9E9E9
| 230121 ||  || — || February 23, 2001 || Kitt Peak || Spacewatch || NEM || align=right | 2.8 km || 
|-id=122 bgcolor=#E9E9E9
| 230122 ||  || — || March 26, 2001 || Socorro || LINEAR || — || align=right | 2.9 km || 
|-id=123 bgcolor=#fefefe
| 230123 ||  || — || May 17, 2001 || Socorro || LINEAR || — || align=right | 1.4 km || 
|-id=124 bgcolor=#fefefe
| 230124 ||  || — || June 28, 2001 || Anderson Mesa || LONEOS || — || align=right | 1.3 km || 
|-id=125 bgcolor=#fefefe
| 230125 ||  || — || June 28, 2001 || Anderson Mesa || LONEOS || KLI || align=right | 3.0 km || 
|-id=126 bgcolor=#fefefe
| 230126 ||  || — || June 27, 2001 || Haleakala || NEAT || — || align=right | 2.0 km || 
|-id=127 bgcolor=#d6d6d6
| 230127 ||  || — || July 13, 2001 || Palomar || NEAT || TEL || align=right | 2.0 km || 
|-id=128 bgcolor=#fefefe
| 230128 ||  || — || July 21, 2001 || Palomar || NEAT || — || align=right | 1.3 km || 
|-id=129 bgcolor=#fefefe
| 230129 ||  || — || July 21, 2001 || Haleakala || NEAT || V || align=right data-sort-value="0.96" | 960 m || 
|-id=130 bgcolor=#fefefe
| 230130 ||  || — || July 20, 2001 || Palomar || NEAT || — || align=right | 1.1 km || 
|-id=131 bgcolor=#fefefe
| 230131 ||  || — || July 23, 2001 || Haleakala || NEAT || FLO || align=right | 1.0 km || 
|-id=132 bgcolor=#fefefe
| 230132 ||  || — || July 26, 2001 || Palomar || NEAT || V || align=right data-sort-value="0.94" | 940 m || 
|-id=133 bgcolor=#d6d6d6
| 230133 ||  || — || July 26, 2001 || Palomar || NEAT || ULA7:4 || align=right | 8.1 km || 
|-id=134 bgcolor=#fefefe
| 230134 ||  || — || July 27, 2001 || Palomar || NEAT || FLO || align=right | 1.0 km || 
|-id=135 bgcolor=#fefefe
| 230135 ||  || — || July 21, 2001 || Haleakala || NEAT || NYS || align=right data-sort-value="0.81" | 810 m || 
|-id=136 bgcolor=#FA8072
| 230136 ||  || — || August 8, 2001 || Haleakala || NEAT || — || align=right | 1.4 km || 
|-id=137 bgcolor=#fefefe
| 230137 ||  || — || August 11, 2001 || Palomar || NEAT || — || align=right | 1.4 km || 
|-id=138 bgcolor=#fefefe
| 230138 ||  || — || August 7, 2001 || Haleakala || NEAT || V || align=right | 1.0 km || 
|-id=139 bgcolor=#fefefe
| 230139 ||  || — || August 13, 2001 || Kvistaberg || UDAS || — || align=right | 1.0 km || 
|-id=140 bgcolor=#fefefe
| 230140 ||  || — || August 10, 2001 || Palomar || NEAT || — || align=right | 2.5 km || 
|-id=141 bgcolor=#d6d6d6
| 230141 ||  || — || August 10, 2001 || Palomar || NEAT || — || align=right | 6.1 km || 
|-id=142 bgcolor=#fefefe
| 230142 ||  || — || August 7, 2001 || Palomar || NEAT || — || align=right | 1.3 km || 
|-id=143 bgcolor=#fefefe
| 230143 ||  || — || August 16, 2001 || Socorro || LINEAR || KLI || align=right | 2.9 km || 
|-id=144 bgcolor=#fefefe
| 230144 ||  || — || August 16, 2001 || Socorro || LINEAR || FLO || align=right data-sort-value="0.96" | 960 m || 
|-id=145 bgcolor=#fefefe
| 230145 ||  || — || August 16, 2001 || Socorro || LINEAR || — || align=right | 1.3 km || 
|-id=146 bgcolor=#d6d6d6
| 230146 ||  || — || August 16, 2001 || Socorro || LINEAR || — || align=right | 5.6 km || 
|-id=147 bgcolor=#fefefe
| 230147 ||  || — || August 16, 2001 || Socorro || LINEAR || NYS || align=right data-sort-value="0.94" | 940 m || 
|-id=148 bgcolor=#fefefe
| 230148 ||  || — || August 16, 2001 || Socorro || LINEAR || — || align=right | 1.1 km || 
|-id=149 bgcolor=#fefefe
| 230149 ||  || — || August 16, 2001 || Socorro || LINEAR || NYS || align=right | 1.1 km || 
|-id=150 bgcolor=#fefefe
| 230150 ||  || — || August 17, 2001 || Socorro || LINEAR || — || align=right | 1.5 km || 
|-id=151 bgcolor=#fefefe
| 230151 Vachier ||  ||  || August 20, 2001 || Pic du Midi || Pic du Midi Obs. || — || align=right | 1.6 km || 
|-id=152 bgcolor=#fefefe
| 230152 ||  || — || August 17, 2001 || Socorro || LINEAR || — || align=right | 4.3 km || 
|-id=153 bgcolor=#fefefe
| 230153 ||  || — || August 19, 2001 || Needville || Needville Obs. || — || align=right | 1.2 km || 
|-id=154 bgcolor=#fefefe
| 230154 ||  || — || August 22, 2001 || Socorro || LINEAR || NYS || align=right | 1.3 km || 
|-id=155 bgcolor=#fefefe
| 230155 Francksallet ||  ||  || August 26, 2001 || Vicques || M. Ory || NYS || align=right | 1.0 km || 
|-id=156 bgcolor=#fefefe
| 230156 ||  || — || August 17, 2001 || Socorro || LINEAR || ERI || align=right | 2.7 km || 
|-id=157 bgcolor=#fefefe
| 230157 ||  || — || August 22, 2001 || Haleakala || NEAT || — || align=right | 1.0 km || 
|-id=158 bgcolor=#fefefe
| 230158 ||  || — || August 23, 2001 || Socorro || LINEAR || H || align=right | 1.2 km || 
|-id=159 bgcolor=#fefefe
| 230159 ||  || — || August 22, 2001 || Kitt Peak || Spacewatch || NYS || align=right | 2.5 km || 
|-id=160 bgcolor=#fefefe
| 230160 ||  || — || August 23, 2001 || Anderson Mesa || LONEOS || — || align=right data-sort-value="0.99" | 990 m || 
|-id=161 bgcolor=#fefefe
| 230161 ||  || — || August 24, 2001 || Anderson Mesa || LONEOS || — || align=right | 1.5 km || 
|-id=162 bgcolor=#fefefe
| 230162 ||  || — || August 24, 2001 || Socorro || LINEAR || V || align=right | 1.2 km || 
|-id=163 bgcolor=#fefefe
| 230163 ||  || — || August 24, 2001 || Socorro || LINEAR || — || align=right | 1.7 km || 
|-id=164 bgcolor=#fefefe
| 230164 ||  || — || August 24, 2001 || Socorro || LINEAR || — || align=right | 1.5 km || 
|-id=165 bgcolor=#fefefe
| 230165 ||  || — || August 24, 2001 || Socorro || LINEAR || NYS || align=right | 1.2 km || 
|-id=166 bgcolor=#fefefe
| 230166 ||  || — || August 25, 2001 || Socorro || LINEAR || MAS || align=right | 1.1 km || 
|-id=167 bgcolor=#fefefe
| 230167 ||  || — || August 25, 2001 || Socorro || LINEAR || MAS || align=right | 1.0 km || 
|-id=168 bgcolor=#fefefe
| 230168 ||  || — || August 26, 2001 || Desert Eagle || W. K. Y. Yeung || — || align=right | 1.1 km || 
|-id=169 bgcolor=#fefefe
| 230169 ||  || — || August 16, 2001 || Socorro || LINEAR || — || align=right | 1.2 km || 
|-id=170 bgcolor=#fefefe
| 230170 ||  || — || August 19, 2001 || Cerro Tololo || Cerro Tololo Obs. || — || align=right data-sort-value="0.99" | 990 m || 
|-id=171 bgcolor=#fefefe
| 230171 ||  || — || August 25, 2001 || Socorro || LINEAR || KLI || align=right | 2.2 km || 
|-id=172 bgcolor=#fefefe
| 230172 ||  || — || September 10, 2001 || Socorro || LINEAR || — || align=right | 1.2 km || 
|-id=173 bgcolor=#fefefe
| 230173 ||  || — || September 7, 2001 || Socorro || LINEAR || NYS || align=right data-sort-value="0.98" | 980 m || 
|-id=174 bgcolor=#fefefe
| 230174 ||  || — || September 10, 2001 || Socorro || LINEAR || — || align=right | 1.8 km || 
|-id=175 bgcolor=#fefefe
| 230175 ||  || — || September 10, 2001 || Socorro || LINEAR || — || align=right | 1.6 km || 
|-id=176 bgcolor=#fefefe
| 230176 ||  || — || September 10, 2001 || Socorro || LINEAR || — || align=right | 1.4 km || 
|-id=177 bgcolor=#fefefe
| 230177 ||  || — || September 14, 2001 || Palomar || NEAT || — || align=right | 2.7 km || 
|-id=178 bgcolor=#fefefe
| 230178 ||  || — || September 12, 2001 || Socorro || LINEAR || — || align=right | 1.3 km || 
|-id=179 bgcolor=#fefefe
| 230179 ||  || — || September 12, 2001 || Socorro || LINEAR || — || align=right | 1.2 km || 
|-id=180 bgcolor=#fefefe
| 230180 ||  || — || September 12, 2001 || Socorro || LINEAR || ERI || align=right | 2.5 km || 
|-id=181 bgcolor=#fefefe
| 230181 ||  || — || September 12, 2001 || Socorro || LINEAR || — || align=right | 1.5 km || 
|-id=182 bgcolor=#fefefe
| 230182 ||  || — || September 12, 2001 || Socorro || LINEAR || NYS || align=right data-sort-value="0.83" | 830 m || 
|-id=183 bgcolor=#fefefe
| 230183 ||  || — || September 11, 2001 || Anderson Mesa || LONEOS || — || align=right | 2.3 km || 
|-id=184 bgcolor=#fefefe
| 230184 ||  || — || September 12, 2001 || Socorro || LINEAR || FLO || align=right data-sort-value="0.93" | 930 m || 
|-id=185 bgcolor=#d6d6d6
| 230185 ||  || — || September 18, 2001 || Kitt Peak || Spacewatch || HYG || align=right | 3.9 km || 
|-id=186 bgcolor=#fefefe
| 230186 ||  || — || September 16, 2001 || Socorro || LINEAR || NYS || align=right data-sort-value="0.97" | 970 m || 
|-id=187 bgcolor=#fefefe
| 230187 ||  || — || September 16, 2001 || Socorro || LINEAR || NYS || align=right data-sort-value="0.87" | 870 m || 
|-id=188 bgcolor=#fefefe
| 230188 ||  || — || September 16, 2001 || Socorro || LINEAR || — || align=right | 1.4 km || 
|-id=189 bgcolor=#fefefe
| 230189 ||  || — || September 16, 2001 || Socorro || LINEAR || NYS || align=right | 1.2 km || 
|-id=190 bgcolor=#d6d6d6
| 230190 ||  || — || September 20, 2001 || Socorro || LINEAR || EUP || align=right | 6.5 km || 
|-id=191 bgcolor=#fefefe
| 230191 ||  || — || September 20, 2001 || Socorro || LINEAR || — || align=right | 1.2 km || 
|-id=192 bgcolor=#fefefe
| 230192 ||  || — || September 16, 2001 || Socorro || LINEAR || — || align=right | 1.4 km || 
|-id=193 bgcolor=#fefefe
| 230193 ||  || — || September 16, 2001 || Socorro || LINEAR || V || align=right data-sort-value="0.97" | 970 m || 
|-id=194 bgcolor=#fefefe
| 230194 ||  || — || September 16, 2001 || Socorro || LINEAR || MAS || align=right data-sort-value="0.92" | 920 m || 
|-id=195 bgcolor=#fefefe
| 230195 ||  || — || September 16, 2001 || Socorro || LINEAR || SUL || align=right | 2.8 km || 
|-id=196 bgcolor=#fefefe
| 230196 ||  || — || September 17, 2001 || Socorro || LINEAR || — || align=right | 1.3 km || 
|-id=197 bgcolor=#fefefe
| 230197 ||  || — || September 17, 2001 || Socorro || LINEAR || — || align=right | 1.2 km || 
|-id=198 bgcolor=#fefefe
| 230198 ||  || — || September 16, 2001 || Socorro || LINEAR || MAS || align=right | 1.4 km || 
|-id=199 bgcolor=#fefefe
| 230199 ||  || — || September 19, 2001 || Socorro || LINEAR || NYS || align=right data-sort-value="0.90" | 900 m || 
|-id=200 bgcolor=#fefefe
| 230200 ||  || — || September 19, 2001 || Socorro || LINEAR || NYS || align=right | 2.2 km || 
|}

230201–230300 

|-bgcolor=#fefefe
| 230201 ||  || — || September 19, 2001 || Socorro || LINEAR || NYS || align=right data-sort-value="0.92" | 920 m || 
|-id=202 bgcolor=#fefefe
| 230202 ||  || — || September 19, 2001 || Socorro || LINEAR || — || align=right | 1.2 km || 
|-id=203 bgcolor=#fefefe
| 230203 ||  || — || September 20, 2001 || Socorro || LINEAR || — || align=right | 1.1 km || 
|-id=204 bgcolor=#fefefe
| 230204 ||  || — || September 25, 2001 || Desert Eagle || W. K. Y. Yeung || — || align=right | 1.0 km || 
|-id=205 bgcolor=#fefefe
| 230205 ||  || — || September 22, 2001 || Kitt Peak || Spacewatch || CLA || align=right | 2.0 km || 
|-id=206 bgcolor=#d6d6d6
| 230206 ||  || — || September 21, 2001 || Anderson Mesa || LONEOS || EUP || align=right | 7.7 km || 
|-id=207 bgcolor=#fefefe
| 230207 ||  || — || September 20, 2001 || Socorro || LINEAR || V || align=right data-sort-value="0.85" | 850 m || 
|-id=208 bgcolor=#fefefe
| 230208 ||  || — || September 22, 2001 || Socorro || LINEAR || MAS || align=right data-sort-value="0.86" | 860 m || 
|-id=209 bgcolor=#fefefe
| 230209 ||  || — || September 25, 2001 || Socorro || LINEAR || V || align=right data-sort-value="0.79" | 790 m || 
|-id=210 bgcolor=#fefefe
| 230210 ||  || — || October 6, 2001 || Palomar || NEAT || NYS || align=right data-sort-value="0.78" | 780 m || 
|-id=211 bgcolor=#fefefe
| 230211 ||  || — || October 14, 2001 || Socorro || LINEAR || — || align=right | 1.5 km || 
|-id=212 bgcolor=#E9E9E9
| 230212 ||  || — || October 14, 2001 || Socorro || LINEAR || — || align=right | 1.4 km || 
|-id=213 bgcolor=#fefefe
| 230213 ||  || — || October 14, 2001 || Socorro || LINEAR || — || align=right | 1.6 km || 
|-id=214 bgcolor=#fefefe
| 230214 ||  || — || October 14, 2001 || Socorro || LINEAR || — || align=right | 1.7 km || 
|-id=215 bgcolor=#fefefe
| 230215 ||  || — || October 14, 2001 || Socorro || LINEAR || V || align=right | 1.3 km || 
|-id=216 bgcolor=#fefefe
| 230216 ||  || — || October 9, 2001 || Kitt Peak || Spacewatch || MAS || align=right | 1.0 km || 
|-id=217 bgcolor=#fefefe
| 230217 ||  || — || October 13, 2001 || Socorro || LINEAR || NYS || align=right | 1.1 km || 
|-id=218 bgcolor=#fefefe
| 230218 ||  || — || October 13, 2001 || Socorro || LINEAR || — || align=right | 1.3 km || 
|-id=219 bgcolor=#fefefe
| 230219 ||  || — || October 13, 2001 || Socorro || LINEAR || NYS || align=right | 1.2 km || 
|-id=220 bgcolor=#fefefe
| 230220 ||  || — || October 14, 2001 || Socorro || LINEAR || — || align=right | 1.3 km || 
|-id=221 bgcolor=#fefefe
| 230221 ||  || — || October 14, 2001 || Socorro || LINEAR || V || align=right | 1.1 km || 
|-id=222 bgcolor=#fefefe
| 230222 ||  || — || October 12, 2001 || Haleakala || NEAT || — || align=right | 1.3 km || 
|-id=223 bgcolor=#E9E9E9
| 230223 ||  || — || October 12, 2001 || Haleakala || NEAT || — || align=right | 1.6 km || 
|-id=224 bgcolor=#fefefe
| 230224 ||  || — || October 15, 2001 || Kitt Peak || Spacewatch || MAS || align=right data-sort-value="0.85" | 850 m || 
|-id=225 bgcolor=#fefefe
| 230225 ||  || — || October 11, 2001 || Palomar || NEAT || NYS || align=right data-sort-value="0.88" | 880 m || 
|-id=226 bgcolor=#fefefe
| 230226 ||  || — || October 14, 2001 || Socorro || LINEAR || NYS || align=right data-sort-value="0.80" | 800 m || 
|-id=227 bgcolor=#fefefe
| 230227 ||  || — || October 14, 2001 || Socorro || LINEAR || V || align=right data-sort-value="0.89" | 890 m || 
|-id=228 bgcolor=#fefefe
| 230228 ||  || — || October 15, 2001 || Palomar || NEAT || — || align=right | 1.7 km || 
|-id=229 bgcolor=#fefefe
| 230229 ||  || — || October 11, 2001 || Socorro || LINEAR || — || align=right | 3.4 km || 
|-id=230 bgcolor=#fefefe
| 230230 ||  || — || October 11, 2001 || Socorro || LINEAR || — || align=right | 1.2 km || 
|-id=231 bgcolor=#fefefe
| 230231 ||  || — || October 8, 2001 || Palomar || NEAT || — || align=right | 1.2 km || 
|-id=232 bgcolor=#fefefe
| 230232 ||  || — || October 8, 2001 || Palomar || NEAT || V || align=right data-sort-value="0.94" | 940 m || 
|-id=233 bgcolor=#fefefe
| 230233 ||  || — || October 17, 2001 || Socorro || LINEAR || — || align=right | 1.00 km || 
|-id=234 bgcolor=#fefefe
| 230234 ||  || — || October 20, 2001 || Socorro || LINEAR || — || align=right | 1.7 km || 
|-id=235 bgcolor=#fefefe
| 230235 ||  || — || October 20, 2001 || Kitt Peak || Spacewatch || — || align=right | 1.4 km || 
|-id=236 bgcolor=#fefefe
| 230236 ||  || — || October 17, 2001 || Socorro || LINEAR || — || align=right | 1.3 km || 
|-id=237 bgcolor=#fefefe
| 230237 ||  || — || October 20, 2001 || Socorro || LINEAR || — || align=right | 1.3 km || 
|-id=238 bgcolor=#fefefe
| 230238 ||  || — || October 16, 2001 || Kitt Peak || Spacewatch || MAS || align=right | 1.1 km || 
|-id=239 bgcolor=#fefefe
| 230239 ||  || — || October 22, 2001 || Socorro || LINEAR || — || align=right | 1.1 km || 
|-id=240 bgcolor=#fefefe
| 230240 ||  || — || October 22, 2001 || Socorro || LINEAR || NYS || align=right data-sort-value="0.82" | 820 m || 
|-id=241 bgcolor=#fefefe
| 230241 ||  || — || October 20, 2001 || Socorro || LINEAR || — || align=right | 1.3 km || 
|-id=242 bgcolor=#fefefe
| 230242 ||  || — || October 20, 2001 || Socorro || LINEAR || fast? || align=right | 1.4 km || 
|-id=243 bgcolor=#fefefe
| 230243 ||  || — || October 21, 2001 || Socorro || LINEAR || — || align=right | 1.2 km || 
|-id=244 bgcolor=#fefefe
| 230244 ||  || — || October 23, 2001 || Socorro || LINEAR || NYS || align=right | 1.2 km || 
|-id=245 bgcolor=#fefefe
| 230245 ||  || — || October 21, 2001 || Socorro || LINEAR || MAS || align=right | 1.0 km || 
|-id=246 bgcolor=#fefefe
| 230246 ||  || — || October 18, 2001 || Kitt Peak || Spacewatch || V || align=right data-sort-value="0.90" | 900 m || 
|-id=247 bgcolor=#E9E9E9
| 230247 ||  || — || November 11, 2001 || Kitt Peak || Spacewatch || GER || align=right | 3.8 km || 
|-id=248 bgcolor=#E9E9E9
| 230248 ||  || — || November 9, 2001 || Socorro || LINEAR || — || align=right | 1.1 km || 
|-id=249 bgcolor=#fefefe
| 230249 ||  || — || November 9, 2001 || Socorro || LINEAR || NYS || align=right data-sort-value="0.84" | 840 m || 
|-id=250 bgcolor=#fefefe
| 230250 ||  || — || November 9, 2001 || Socorro || LINEAR || V || align=right | 1.0 km || 
|-id=251 bgcolor=#d6d6d6
| 230251 ||  || — || November 9, 2001 || Socorro || LINEAR || 3:2 || align=right | 6.3 km || 
|-id=252 bgcolor=#E9E9E9
| 230252 ||  || — || November 9, 2001 || Socorro || LINEAR || HNS || align=right | 1.9 km || 
|-id=253 bgcolor=#fefefe
| 230253 ||  || — || November 10, 2001 || Socorro || LINEAR || V || align=right | 1.1 km || 
|-id=254 bgcolor=#fefefe
| 230254 ||  || — || November 10, 2001 || Socorro || LINEAR || V || align=right | 1.2 km || 
|-id=255 bgcolor=#fefefe
| 230255 ||  || — || November 12, 2001 || Socorro || LINEAR || NYS || align=right data-sort-value="0.87" | 870 m || 
|-id=256 bgcolor=#fefefe
| 230256 ||  || — || November 12, 2001 || Socorro || LINEAR || NYS || align=right | 1.1 km || 
|-id=257 bgcolor=#fefefe
| 230257 ||  || — || November 12, 2001 || Socorro || LINEAR || NYS || align=right | 1.1 km || 
|-id=258 bgcolor=#fefefe
| 230258 ||  || — || November 17, 2001 || Socorro || LINEAR || — || align=right | 1.2 km || 
|-id=259 bgcolor=#E9E9E9
| 230259 ||  || — || November 17, 2001 || Kitt Peak || Spacewatch || — || align=right data-sort-value="0.87" | 870 m || 
|-id=260 bgcolor=#fefefe
| 230260 ||  || — || November 17, 2001 || Socorro || LINEAR || NYS || align=right | 3.2 km || 
|-id=261 bgcolor=#E9E9E9
| 230261 ||  || — || November 18, 2001 || Socorro || LINEAR || — || align=right | 1.4 km || 
|-id=262 bgcolor=#fefefe
| 230262 ||  || — || November 19, 2001 || Socorro || LINEAR || NYS || align=right | 1.1 km || 
|-id=263 bgcolor=#fefefe
| 230263 ||  || — || November 19, 2001 || Socorro || LINEAR || — || align=right | 1.1 km || 
|-id=264 bgcolor=#E9E9E9
| 230264 ||  || — || November 20, 2001 || Socorro || LINEAR || — || align=right | 1.2 km || 
|-id=265 bgcolor=#E9E9E9
| 230265 ||  || — || November 20, 2001 || Socorro || LINEAR || — || align=right | 1.1 km || 
|-id=266 bgcolor=#fefefe
| 230266 ||  || — || November 20, 2001 || Socorro || LINEAR || — || align=right | 1.1 km || 
|-id=267 bgcolor=#fefefe
| 230267 ||  || — || November 21, 2001 || Socorro || LINEAR || — || align=right | 1.3 km || 
|-id=268 bgcolor=#fefefe
| 230268 ||  || — || December 10, 2001 || Socorro || LINEAR || H || align=right data-sort-value="0.95" | 950 m || 
|-id=269 bgcolor=#FA8072
| 230269 ||  || — || December 11, 2001 || Socorro || LINEAR || H || align=right | 1.1 km || 
|-id=270 bgcolor=#E9E9E9
| 230270 ||  || — || December 9, 2001 || Socorro || LINEAR || — || align=right | 1.3 km || 
|-id=271 bgcolor=#fefefe
| 230271 ||  || — || December 10, 2001 || Socorro || LINEAR || — || align=right | 1.2 km || 
|-id=272 bgcolor=#fefefe
| 230272 ||  || — || December 9, 2001 || Socorro || LINEAR || H || align=right data-sort-value="0.89" | 890 m || 
|-id=273 bgcolor=#fefefe
| 230273 ||  || — || December 10, 2001 || Socorro || LINEAR || NYS || align=right data-sort-value="0.95" | 950 m || 
|-id=274 bgcolor=#E9E9E9
| 230274 ||  || — || December 10, 2001 || Socorro || LINEAR || — || align=right | 1.2 km || 
|-id=275 bgcolor=#fefefe
| 230275 ||  || — || December 11, 2001 || Socorro || LINEAR || MAS || align=right | 1.1 km || 
|-id=276 bgcolor=#fefefe
| 230276 ||  || — || December 11, 2001 || Socorro || LINEAR || NYS || align=right | 1.1 km || 
|-id=277 bgcolor=#fefefe
| 230277 ||  || — || December 14, 2001 || Socorro || LINEAR || — || align=right | 1.4 km || 
|-id=278 bgcolor=#E9E9E9
| 230278 ||  || — || December 14, 2001 || Socorro || LINEAR || — || align=right | 1.3 km || 
|-id=279 bgcolor=#fefefe
| 230279 ||  || — || December 14, 2001 || Socorro || LINEAR || MAS || align=right | 1.2 km || 
|-id=280 bgcolor=#E9E9E9
| 230280 ||  || — || December 15, 2001 || Socorro || LINEAR || — || align=right | 1.4 km || 
|-id=281 bgcolor=#fefefe
| 230281 ||  || — || December 11, 2001 || Socorro || LINEAR || — || align=right | 1.3 km || 
|-id=282 bgcolor=#E9E9E9
| 230282 ||  || — || December 13, 2001 || Socorro || LINEAR || BRU || align=right | 3.5 km || 
|-id=283 bgcolor=#fefefe
| 230283 ||  || — || December 14, 2001 || Socorro || LINEAR || NYS || align=right data-sort-value="0.93" | 930 m || 
|-id=284 bgcolor=#E9E9E9
| 230284 ||  || — || December 15, 2001 || Socorro || LINEAR || — || align=right | 1.9 km || 
|-id=285 bgcolor=#fefefe
| 230285 ||  || — || December 15, 2001 || Socorro || LINEAR || MAS || align=right | 1.1 km || 
|-id=286 bgcolor=#fefefe
| 230286 ||  || — || December 15, 2001 || Socorro || LINEAR || — || align=right | 1.1 km || 
|-id=287 bgcolor=#fefefe
| 230287 ||  || — || December 15, 2001 || Socorro || LINEAR || — || align=right | 1.6 km || 
|-id=288 bgcolor=#fefefe
| 230288 ||  || — || December 14, 2001 || Socorro || LINEAR || — || align=right | 1.2 km || 
|-id=289 bgcolor=#fefefe
| 230289 ||  || — || December 14, 2001 || Socorro || LINEAR || H || align=right | 1.1 km || 
|-id=290 bgcolor=#fefefe
| 230290 ||  || — || December 17, 2001 || Socorro || LINEAR || SULslow || align=right | 3.4 km || 
|-id=291 bgcolor=#fefefe
| 230291 ||  || — || December 18, 2001 || Socorro || LINEAR || V || align=right | 1.0 km || 
|-id=292 bgcolor=#d6d6d6
| 230292 ||  || — || December 18, 2001 || Socorro || LINEAR || 3:2 || align=right | 3.7 km || 
|-id=293 bgcolor=#d6d6d6
| 230293 ||  || — || December 18, 2001 || Socorro || LINEAR || 3:2 || align=right | 6.5 km || 
|-id=294 bgcolor=#d6d6d6
| 230294 ||  || — || December 18, 2001 || Socorro || LINEAR || HIL3:2 || align=right | 5.4 km || 
|-id=295 bgcolor=#E9E9E9
| 230295 ||  || — || December 18, 2001 || Palomar || NEAT || — || align=right | 3.8 km || 
|-id=296 bgcolor=#E9E9E9
| 230296 ||  || — || December 19, 2001 || Palomar || NEAT || — || align=right | 2.2 km || 
|-id=297 bgcolor=#fefefe
| 230297 ||  || — || January 9, 2002 || Socorro || LINEAR || H || align=right data-sort-value="0.82" | 820 m || 
|-id=298 bgcolor=#fefefe
| 230298 ||  || — || January 8, 2002 || Cima Ekar || ADAS || — || align=right | 1.4 km || 
|-id=299 bgcolor=#E9E9E9
| 230299 ||  || — || January 9, 2002 || Socorro || LINEAR || — || align=right | 2.8 km || 
|-id=300 bgcolor=#E9E9E9
| 230300 ||  || — || January 9, 2002 || Socorro || LINEAR || — || align=right | 1.2 km || 
|}

230301–230400 

|-bgcolor=#E9E9E9
| 230301 ||  || — || January 9, 2002 || Socorro || LINEAR || KON || align=right | 3.7 km || 
|-id=302 bgcolor=#E9E9E9
| 230302 ||  || — || January 13, 2002 || Socorro || LINEAR || — || align=right | 1.4 km || 
|-id=303 bgcolor=#E9E9E9
| 230303 ||  || — || January 9, 2002 || Socorro || LINEAR || MIS || align=right | 3.1 km || 
|-id=304 bgcolor=#fefefe
| 230304 ||  || — || January 9, 2002 || Socorro || LINEAR || — || align=right | 1.2 km || 
|-id=305 bgcolor=#E9E9E9
| 230305 ||  || — || January 9, 2002 || Socorro || LINEAR || — || align=right | 3.1 km || 
|-id=306 bgcolor=#E9E9E9
| 230306 ||  || — || January 12, 2002 || Palomar || NEAT || — || align=right | 5.1 km || 
|-id=307 bgcolor=#fefefe
| 230307 ||  || — || January 13, 2002 || Socorro || LINEAR || NYS || align=right data-sort-value="0.92" | 920 m || 
|-id=308 bgcolor=#E9E9E9
| 230308 ||  || — || January 13, 2002 || Socorro || LINEAR || — || align=right | 3.8 km || 
|-id=309 bgcolor=#d6d6d6
| 230309 ||  || — || January 14, 2002 || Socorro || LINEAR || 3:2 || align=right | 4.8 km || 
|-id=310 bgcolor=#E9E9E9
| 230310 ||  || — || January 14, 2002 || Socorro || LINEAR || — || align=right | 1.6 km || 
|-id=311 bgcolor=#E9E9E9
| 230311 ||  || — || January 19, 2002 || Desert Eagle || W. K. Y. Yeung || — || align=right | 1.3 km || 
|-id=312 bgcolor=#E9E9E9
| 230312 ||  || — || January 19, 2002 || Socorro || LINEAR || — || align=right | 1.6 km || 
|-id=313 bgcolor=#E9E9E9
| 230313 ||  || — || February 3, 2002 || Palomar || NEAT || EUN || align=right | 2.3 km || 
|-id=314 bgcolor=#E9E9E9
| 230314 ||  || — || February 6, 2002 || Socorro || LINEAR || — || align=right | 1.9 km || 
|-id=315 bgcolor=#E9E9E9
| 230315 ||  || — || February 6, 2002 || Socorro || LINEAR || — || align=right | 1.5 km || 
|-id=316 bgcolor=#E9E9E9
| 230316 ||  || — || February 6, 2002 || Socorro || LINEAR || — || align=right | 1.6 km || 
|-id=317 bgcolor=#E9E9E9
| 230317 ||  || — || February 6, 2002 || Socorro || LINEAR || HNS || align=right | 1.9 km || 
|-id=318 bgcolor=#E9E9E9
| 230318 ||  || — || February 7, 2002 || Socorro || LINEAR || — || align=right | 2.1 km || 
|-id=319 bgcolor=#E9E9E9
| 230319 ||  || — || February 6, 2002 || Haleakala || NEAT || — || align=right | 2.4 km || 
|-id=320 bgcolor=#E9E9E9
| 230320 ||  || — || February 12, 2002 || Desert Eagle || W. K. Y. Yeung || — || align=right | 3.1 km || 
|-id=321 bgcolor=#E9E9E9
| 230321 ||  || — || February 7, 2002 || Socorro || LINEAR || — || align=right | 3.0 km || 
|-id=322 bgcolor=#E9E9E9
| 230322 ||  || — || February 7, 2002 || Socorro || LINEAR || — || align=right | 1.6 km || 
|-id=323 bgcolor=#E9E9E9
| 230323 ||  || — || February 7, 2002 || Socorro || LINEAR || — || align=right | 3.1 km || 
|-id=324 bgcolor=#E9E9E9
| 230324 ||  || — || February 7, 2002 || Socorro || LINEAR || — || align=right | 1.8 km || 
|-id=325 bgcolor=#E9E9E9
| 230325 ||  || — || February 7, 2002 || Socorro || LINEAR || — || align=right | 1.7 km || 
|-id=326 bgcolor=#E9E9E9
| 230326 ||  || — || February 7, 2002 || Socorro || LINEAR || — || align=right | 1.6 km || 
|-id=327 bgcolor=#E9E9E9
| 230327 ||  || — || February 7, 2002 || Socorro || LINEAR || — || align=right | 2.2 km || 
|-id=328 bgcolor=#E9E9E9
| 230328 ||  || — || February 7, 2002 || Socorro || LINEAR || EUN || align=right | 1.8 km || 
|-id=329 bgcolor=#E9E9E9
| 230329 ||  || — || February 7, 2002 || Socorro || LINEAR || — || align=right | 2.4 km || 
|-id=330 bgcolor=#E9E9E9
| 230330 ||  || — || February 7, 2002 || Socorro || LINEAR || — || align=right | 3.1 km || 
|-id=331 bgcolor=#E9E9E9
| 230331 ||  || — || February 7, 2002 || Socorro || LINEAR || — || align=right | 1.2 km || 
|-id=332 bgcolor=#E9E9E9
| 230332 ||  || — || February 7, 2002 || Socorro || LINEAR || MAR || align=right | 1.8 km || 
|-id=333 bgcolor=#E9E9E9
| 230333 ||  || — || February 7, 2002 || Socorro || LINEAR || — || align=right | 2.3 km || 
|-id=334 bgcolor=#d6d6d6
| 230334 ||  || — || February 9, 2002 || Socorro || LINEAR || HIL3:2 || align=right | 6.6 km || 
|-id=335 bgcolor=#E9E9E9
| 230335 ||  || — || February 9, 2002 || Socorro || LINEAR || — || align=right | 2.9 km || 
|-id=336 bgcolor=#fefefe
| 230336 ||  || — || February 10, 2002 || Socorro || LINEAR || — || align=right | 1.5 km || 
|-id=337 bgcolor=#E9E9E9
| 230337 ||  || — || February 10, 2002 || Socorro || LINEAR || — || align=right | 1.3 km || 
|-id=338 bgcolor=#E9E9E9
| 230338 ||  || — || February 10, 2002 || Socorro || LINEAR || — || align=right | 1.2 km || 
|-id=339 bgcolor=#C2FFFF
| 230339 ||  || — || February 10, 2002 || Socorro || LINEAR || L4 || align=right | 11 km || 
|-id=340 bgcolor=#E9E9E9
| 230340 ||  || — || February 10, 2002 || Socorro || LINEAR || — || align=right | 2.6 km || 
|-id=341 bgcolor=#E9E9E9
| 230341 ||  || — || February 10, 2002 || Socorro || LINEAR || — || align=right | 1.2 km || 
|-id=342 bgcolor=#E9E9E9
| 230342 ||  || — || February 10, 2002 || Socorro || LINEAR || — || align=right | 1.4 km || 
|-id=343 bgcolor=#E9E9E9
| 230343 ||  || — || February 10, 2002 || Socorro || LINEAR || — || align=right | 2.0 km || 
|-id=344 bgcolor=#E9E9E9
| 230344 ||  || — || February 11, 2002 || Socorro || LINEAR || — || align=right | 1.3 km || 
|-id=345 bgcolor=#E9E9E9
| 230345 ||  || — || February 4, 2002 || Eskridge || Farpoint Obs. || EUN || align=right | 1.4 km || 
|-id=346 bgcolor=#d6d6d6
| 230346 ||  || — || February 7, 2002 || Socorro || LINEAR || 3:2 || align=right | 7.9 km || 
|-id=347 bgcolor=#E9E9E9
| 230347 ||  || — || February 8, 2002 || Palomar || NEAT || EUN || align=right | 2.2 km || 
|-id=348 bgcolor=#E9E9E9
| 230348 ||  || — || February 7, 2002 || Palomar || NEAT || — || align=right | 1.1 km || 
|-id=349 bgcolor=#E9E9E9
| 230349 ||  || — || February 8, 2002 || Haleakala || NEAT || — || align=right | 2.2 km || 
|-id=350 bgcolor=#E9E9E9
| 230350 ||  || — || February 9, 2002 || Kitt Peak || Spacewatch || — || align=right | 4.3 km || 
|-id=351 bgcolor=#E9E9E9
| 230351 ||  || — || February 10, 2002 || Socorro || LINEAR || — || align=right | 1.7 km || 
|-id=352 bgcolor=#fefefe
| 230352 ||  || — || February 11, 2002 || Socorro || LINEAR || — || align=right | 1.5 km || 
|-id=353 bgcolor=#E9E9E9
| 230353 ||  || — || February 13, 2002 || Socorro || LINEAR || — || align=right | 4.0 km || 
|-id=354 bgcolor=#E9E9E9
| 230354 ||  || — || February 6, 2002 || Palomar || NEAT || — || align=right | 2.7 km || 
|-id=355 bgcolor=#E9E9E9
| 230355 ||  || — || February 7, 2002 || Palomar || NEAT || — || align=right | 1.0 km || 
|-id=356 bgcolor=#E9E9E9
| 230356 ||  || — || February 18, 2002 || Oaxaca || J. M. Roe || — || align=right | 1.7 km || 
|-id=357 bgcolor=#E9E9E9
| 230357 ||  || — || March 10, 2002 || Palomar || NEAT || — || align=right | 4.1 km || 
|-id=358 bgcolor=#E9E9E9
| 230358 ||  || — || March 9, 2002 || Kitt Peak || Spacewatch || — || align=right | 2.9 km || 
|-id=359 bgcolor=#E9E9E9
| 230359 ||  || — || March 13, 2002 || Socorro || LINEAR || — || align=right | 2.4 km || 
|-id=360 bgcolor=#E9E9E9
| 230360 ||  || — || March 13, 2002 || Socorro || LINEAR || — || align=right | 1.2 km || 
|-id=361 bgcolor=#fefefe
| 230361 ||  || — || March 13, 2002 || Socorro || LINEAR || — || align=right | 2.5 km || 
|-id=362 bgcolor=#E9E9E9
| 230362 ||  || — || March 9, 2002 || Socorro || LINEAR || — || align=right | 1.6 km || 
|-id=363 bgcolor=#fefefe
| 230363 ||  || — || March 11, 2002 || Kitt Peak || Spacewatch || FLO || align=right data-sort-value="0.81" | 810 m || 
|-id=364 bgcolor=#E9E9E9
| 230364 ||  || — || March 6, 2002 || Catalina || CSS || — || align=right | 1.9 km || 
|-id=365 bgcolor=#E9E9E9
| 230365 ||  || — || March 6, 2002 || Socorro || LINEAR || MAR || align=right | 2.4 km || 
|-id=366 bgcolor=#E9E9E9
| 230366 ||  || — || March 10, 2002 || Anderson Mesa || LONEOS || — || align=right | 1.4 km || 
|-id=367 bgcolor=#E9E9E9
| 230367 ||  || — || March 12, 2002 || Palomar || NEAT || — || align=right | 2.2 km || 
|-id=368 bgcolor=#E9E9E9
| 230368 ||  || — || March 15, 2002 || Palomar || NEAT || — || align=right | 2.1 km || 
|-id=369 bgcolor=#E9E9E9
| 230369 ||  || — || March 11, 2002 || Kitt Peak || Spacewatch || — || align=right | 1.8 km || 
|-id=370 bgcolor=#E9E9E9
| 230370 ||  || — || March 19, 2002 || Fountain Hills || Fountain Hills Obs. || JUN || align=right | 2.6 km || 
|-id=371 bgcolor=#E9E9E9
| 230371 ||  || — || March 16, 2002 || Anderson Mesa || LONEOS || — || align=right | 3.8 km || 
|-id=372 bgcolor=#E9E9E9
| 230372 ||  || — || March 16, 2002 || Haleakala || NEAT || — || align=right | 3.9 km || 
|-id=373 bgcolor=#E9E9E9
| 230373 ||  || — || March 16, 2002 || Haleakala || NEAT || — || align=right | 3.5 km || 
|-id=374 bgcolor=#E9E9E9
| 230374 ||  || — || April 14, 2002 || Desert Eagle || W. K. Y. Yeung || — || align=right | 1.8 km || 
|-id=375 bgcolor=#E9E9E9
| 230375 ||  || — || April 14, 2002 || Socorro || LINEAR || — || align=right | 1.8 km || 
|-id=376 bgcolor=#E9E9E9
| 230376 ||  || — || April 15, 2002 || Socorro || LINEAR || — || align=right | 3.6 km || 
|-id=377 bgcolor=#E9E9E9
| 230377 ||  || — || April 13, 2002 || Palomar || NEAT || MIT || align=right | 3.3 km || 
|-id=378 bgcolor=#E9E9E9
| 230378 ||  || — || April 14, 2002 || Socorro || LINEAR || — || align=right | 2.9 km || 
|-id=379 bgcolor=#E9E9E9
| 230379 ||  || — || April 5, 2002 || Palomar || NEAT || — || align=right | 1.6 km || 
|-id=380 bgcolor=#d6d6d6
| 230380 ||  || — || April 5, 2002 || Anderson Mesa || LONEOS || — || align=right | 4.0 km || 
|-id=381 bgcolor=#fefefe
| 230381 ||  || — || April 9, 2002 || Socorro || LINEAR || ERI || align=right | 2.2 km || 
|-id=382 bgcolor=#E9E9E9
| 230382 ||  || — || April 9, 2002 || Socorro || LINEAR || — || align=right | 1.7 km || 
|-id=383 bgcolor=#E9E9E9
| 230383 ||  || — || April 10, 2002 || Socorro || LINEAR || — || align=right | 2.5 km || 
|-id=384 bgcolor=#E9E9E9
| 230384 ||  || — || April 10, 2002 || Socorro || LINEAR || — || align=right | 4.4 km || 
|-id=385 bgcolor=#E9E9E9
| 230385 ||  || — || April 11, 2002 || Socorro || LINEAR || — || align=right | 2.4 km || 
|-id=386 bgcolor=#E9E9E9
| 230386 ||  || — || April 12, 2002 || Palomar || NEAT || — || align=right | 3.5 km || 
|-id=387 bgcolor=#E9E9E9
| 230387 ||  || — || April 12, 2002 || Haleakala || NEAT || — || align=right | 3.4 km || 
|-id=388 bgcolor=#d6d6d6
| 230388 ||  || — || April 10, 2002 || Socorro || LINEAR || — || align=right | 3.6 km || 
|-id=389 bgcolor=#E9E9E9
| 230389 ||  || — || April 12, 2002 || Socorro || LINEAR || — || align=right | 1.7 km || 
|-id=390 bgcolor=#E9E9E9
| 230390 ||  || — || April 11, 2002 || Anderson Mesa || LONEOS || — || align=right | 3.7 km || 
|-id=391 bgcolor=#E9E9E9
| 230391 ||  || — || April 14, 2002 || Haleakala || NEAT || — || align=right | 1.4 km || 
|-id=392 bgcolor=#E9E9E9
| 230392 ||  || — || April 15, 2002 || Anderson Mesa || LONEOS || PAE || align=right | 5.0 km || 
|-id=393 bgcolor=#E9E9E9
| 230393 ||  || — || April 9, 2002 || Socorro || LINEAR || MIS || align=right | 2.7 km || 
|-id=394 bgcolor=#E9E9E9
| 230394 ||  || — || April 12, 2002 || Socorro || LINEAR || — || align=right | 1.4 km || 
|-id=395 bgcolor=#E9E9E9
| 230395 ||  || — || May 7, 2002 || Socorro || LINEAR || — || align=right | 3.5 km || 
|-id=396 bgcolor=#E9E9E9
| 230396 ||  || — || May 7, 2002 || Socorro || LINEAR || — || align=right | 3.9 km || 
|-id=397 bgcolor=#d6d6d6
| 230397 ||  || — || May 9, 2002 || Socorro || LINEAR || THB || align=right | 4.9 km || 
|-id=398 bgcolor=#E9E9E9
| 230398 ||  || — || May 9, 2002 || Socorro || LINEAR || — || align=right | 4.0 km || 
|-id=399 bgcolor=#E9E9E9
| 230399 ||  || — || May 8, 2002 || Socorro || LINEAR || — || align=right | 2.9 km || 
|-id=400 bgcolor=#E9E9E9
| 230400 ||  || — || May 11, 2002 || Socorro || LINEAR || — || align=right | 2.9 km || 
|}

230401–230500 

|-bgcolor=#E9E9E9
| 230401 ||  || — || May 9, 2002 || Socorro || LINEAR || — || align=right | 3.7 km || 
|-id=402 bgcolor=#E9E9E9
| 230402 ||  || — || May 11, 2002 || Socorro || LINEAR || — || align=right | 2.1 km || 
|-id=403 bgcolor=#E9E9E9
| 230403 ||  || — || May 5, 2002 || Palomar || NEAT || — || align=right | 2.7 km || 
|-id=404 bgcolor=#E9E9E9
| 230404 ||  || — || May 8, 2002 || Kitt Peak || Spacewatch || — || align=right | 4.3 km || 
|-id=405 bgcolor=#E9E9E9
| 230405 ||  || — || May 11, 2002 || Socorro || LINEAR || — || align=right | 2.9 km || 
|-id=406 bgcolor=#E9E9E9
| 230406 ||  || — || May 13, 2002 || Palomar || NEAT || JUN || align=right | 1.8 km || 
|-id=407 bgcolor=#E9E9E9
| 230407 ||  || — || May 16, 2002 || Socorro || LINEAR || — || align=right | 3.7 km || 
|-id=408 bgcolor=#E9E9E9
| 230408 ||  || — || May 18, 2002 || Palomar || NEAT || — || align=right | 2.3 km || 
|-id=409 bgcolor=#E9E9E9
| 230409 ||  || — || May 31, 2002 || Palomar || NEAT || EUN || align=right | 2.0 km || 
|-id=410 bgcolor=#E9E9E9
| 230410 ||  || — || May 30, 2002 || Palomar || NEAT || — || align=right | 3.4 km || 
|-id=411 bgcolor=#E9E9E9
| 230411 ||  || — || June 6, 2002 || Socorro || LINEAR || POS || align=right | 5.6 km || 
|-id=412 bgcolor=#fefefe
| 230412 ||  || — || June 1, 2002 || Palomar || NEAT || — || align=right | 1.4 km || 
|-id=413 bgcolor=#d6d6d6
| 230413 ||  || — || June 10, 2002 || Socorro || LINEAR || — || align=right | 6.7 km || 
|-id=414 bgcolor=#E9E9E9
| 230414 ||  || — || June 5, 2002 || Anderson Mesa || LONEOS || — || align=right | 4.5 km || 
|-id=415 bgcolor=#fefefe
| 230415 Matthiasjung ||  ||  || June 20, 2002 || Palomar || NEAT || — || align=right | 1.2 km || 
|-id=416 bgcolor=#d6d6d6
| 230416 ||  || — || July 9, 2002 || Socorro || LINEAR || — || align=right | 5.4 km || 
|-id=417 bgcolor=#d6d6d6
| 230417 ||  || — || July 9, 2002 || Socorro || LINEAR || — || align=right | 4.2 km || 
|-id=418 bgcolor=#fefefe
| 230418 ||  || — || July 14, 2002 || Socorro || LINEAR || — || align=right data-sort-value="0.89" | 890 m || 
|-id=419 bgcolor=#d6d6d6
| 230419 ||  || — || July 18, 2002 || Palomar || NEAT || — || align=right | 4.9 km || 
|-id=420 bgcolor=#FFC2E0
| 230420 ||  || — || August 5, 2002 || Palomar || NEAT || APOcritical || align=right data-sort-value="0.59" | 590 m || 
|-id=421 bgcolor=#d6d6d6
| 230421 ||  || — || August 6, 2002 || Palomar || NEAT || EOS || align=right | 2.7 km || 
|-id=422 bgcolor=#d6d6d6
| 230422 ||  || — || August 6, 2002 || Palomar || NEAT || EOS || align=right | 2.6 km || 
|-id=423 bgcolor=#d6d6d6
| 230423 ||  || — || August 6, 2002 || Palomar || NEAT || TIR || align=right | 4.9 km || 
|-id=424 bgcolor=#d6d6d6
| 230424 ||  || — || August 8, 2002 || Palomar || NEAT || — || align=right | 3.5 km || 
|-id=425 bgcolor=#d6d6d6
| 230425 ||  || — || August 6, 2002 || Palomar || NEAT || EOS || align=right | 2.8 km || 
|-id=426 bgcolor=#fefefe
| 230426 ||  || — || August 13, 2002 || Socorro || LINEAR || FLO || align=right data-sort-value="0.71" | 710 m || 
|-id=427 bgcolor=#d6d6d6
| 230427 ||  || — || August 13, 2002 || Anderson Mesa || LONEOS || — || align=right | 4.4 km || 
|-id=428 bgcolor=#d6d6d6
| 230428 ||  || — || August 13, 2002 || Socorro || LINEAR || — || align=right | 4.2 km || 
|-id=429 bgcolor=#d6d6d6
| 230429 ||  || — || August 13, 2002 || Anderson Mesa || LONEOS || — || align=right | 4.4 km || 
|-id=430 bgcolor=#fefefe
| 230430 ||  || — || August 13, 2002 || Anderson Mesa || LONEOS || — || align=right data-sort-value="0.91" | 910 m || 
|-id=431 bgcolor=#d6d6d6
| 230431 ||  || — || August 15, 2002 || Palomar || NEAT || — || align=right | 4.5 km || 
|-id=432 bgcolor=#d6d6d6
| 230432 ||  || — || August 14, 2002 || Socorro || LINEAR || TIR || align=right | 6.0 km || 
|-id=433 bgcolor=#d6d6d6
| 230433 ||  || — || August 13, 2002 || Socorro || LINEAR || — || align=right | 7.7 km || 
|-id=434 bgcolor=#d6d6d6
| 230434 ||  || — || August 10, 2002 || Cerro Tololo || M. W. Buie || — || align=right | 3.8 km || 
|-id=435 bgcolor=#fefefe
| 230435 ||  || — || August 8, 2002 || Palomar || NEAT || — || align=right data-sort-value="0.83" | 830 m || 
|-id=436 bgcolor=#d6d6d6
| 230436 ||  || — || August 8, 2002 || Palomar || S. F. Hönig || TIR || align=right | 4.8 km || 
|-id=437 bgcolor=#d6d6d6
| 230437 ||  || — || August 8, 2002 || Palomar || S. F. Hönig || — || align=right | 3.7 km || 
|-id=438 bgcolor=#d6d6d6
| 230438 ||  || — || August 8, 2002 || Palomar || S. F. Hönig || — || align=right | 4.3 km || 
|-id=439 bgcolor=#d6d6d6
| 230439 ||  || — || August 8, 2002 || Palomar || S. F. Hönig || EOS || align=right | 2.6 km || 
|-id=440 bgcolor=#d6d6d6
| 230440 ||  || — || August 8, 2002 || Palomar || A. Lowe || — || align=right | 3.1 km || 
|-id=441 bgcolor=#d6d6d6
| 230441 ||  || — || August 29, 2002 || Palomar || S. F. Hönig || — || align=right | 3.5 km || 
|-id=442 bgcolor=#d6d6d6
| 230442 ||  || — || August 28, 2002 || Palomar || NEAT || EOS || align=right | 2.7 km || 
|-id=443 bgcolor=#d6d6d6
| 230443 ||  || — || August 17, 2002 || Palomar || NEAT || EOS || align=right | 2.6 km || 
|-id=444 bgcolor=#E9E9E9
| 230444 ||  || — || August 19, 2002 || Palomar || NEAT || — || align=right | 2.8 km || 
|-id=445 bgcolor=#d6d6d6
| 230445 ||  || — || August 18, 2002 || Palomar || NEAT || TIR || align=right | 4.1 km || 
|-id=446 bgcolor=#d6d6d6
| 230446 ||  || — || August 29, 2002 || Palomar || NEAT || EOS || align=right | 2.7 km || 
|-id=447 bgcolor=#d6d6d6
| 230447 ||  || — || August 17, 2002 || Palomar || NEAT || HYG || align=right | 2.9 km || 
|-id=448 bgcolor=#d6d6d6
| 230448 ||  || — || August 16, 2002 || Palomar || NEAT || YAK || align=right | 4.4 km || 
|-id=449 bgcolor=#fefefe
| 230449 ||  || — || August 30, 2002 || Palomar || NEAT || FLO || align=right data-sort-value="0.56" | 560 m || 
|-id=450 bgcolor=#d6d6d6
| 230450 ||  || — || August 28, 2002 || Palomar || NEAT || — || align=right | 4.3 km || 
|-id=451 bgcolor=#d6d6d6
| 230451 ||  || — || September 4, 2002 || Palomar || NEAT || THM || align=right | 4.0 km || 
|-id=452 bgcolor=#fefefe
| 230452 ||  || — || September 4, 2002 || Anderson Mesa || LONEOS || FLO || align=right | 2.0 km || 
|-id=453 bgcolor=#E9E9E9
| 230453 ||  || — || September 5, 2002 || Socorro || LINEAR || — || align=right | 2.3 km || 
|-id=454 bgcolor=#fefefe
| 230454 ||  || — || September 5, 2002 || Socorro || LINEAR || — || align=right data-sort-value="0.94" | 940 m || 
|-id=455 bgcolor=#fefefe
| 230455 ||  || — || September 5, 2002 || Socorro || LINEAR || FLO || align=right | 1.5 km || 
|-id=456 bgcolor=#d6d6d6
| 230456 ||  || — || September 6, 2002 || Socorro || LINEAR || — || align=right | 4.3 km || 
|-id=457 bgcolor=#d6d6d6
| 230457 ||  || — || September 7, 2002 || Campo Imperatore || CINEOS || — || align=right | 5.4 km || 
|-id=458 bgcolor=#fefefe
| 230458 ||  || — || September 5, 2002 || Haleakala || NEAT || — || align=right data-sort-value="0.99" | 990 m || 
|-id=459 bgcolor=#d6d6d6
| 230459 ||  || — || September 10, 2002 || Haleakala || NEAT || — || align=right | 5.7 km || 
|-id=460 bgcolor=#fefefe
| 230460 ||  || — || September 10, 2002 || Haleakala || NEAT || FLO || align=right data-sort-value="0.65" | 650 m || 
|-id=461 bgcolor=#d6d6d6
| 230461 ||  || — || September 11, 2002 || Palomar || NEAT || EMA || align=right | 4.0 km || 
|-id=462 bgcolor=#d6d6d6
| 230462 ||  || — || September 11, 2002 || Palomar || NEAT || — || align=right | 4.0 km || 
|-id=463 bgcolor=#d6d6d6
| 230463 ||  || — || September 11, 2002 || Haleakala || NEAT || — || align=right | 4.3 km || 
|-id=464 bgcolor=#d6d6d6
| 230464 ||  || — || September 12, 2002 || Palomar || NEAT || VER || align=right | 4.8 km || 
|-id=465 bgcolor=#d6d6d6
| 230465 ||  || — || September 12, 2002 || Palomar || NEAT || — || align=right | 5.4 km || 
|-id=466 bgcolor=#d6d6d6
| 230466 ||  || — || September 13, 2002 || Palomar || NEAT || HYG || align=right | 3.5 km || 
|-id=467 bgcolor=#d6d6d6
| 230467 ||  || — || September 13, 2002 || Palomar || NEAT || HYG || align=right | 4.9 km || 
|-id=468 bgcolor=#d6d6d6
| 230468 ||  || — || September 13, 2002 || Palomar || NEAT || — || align=right | 4.5 km || 
|-id=469 bgcolor=#fefefe
| 230469 ||  || — || September 13, 2002 || Palomar || NEAT || — || align=right data-sort-value="0.96" | 960 m || 
|-id=470 bgcolor=#d6d6d6
| 230470 ||  || — || September 13, 2002 || Palomar || NEAT || — || align=right | 3.6 km || 
|-id=471 bgcolor=#fefefe
| 230471 ||  || — || September 14, 2002 || Haleakala || NEAT || V || align=right | 1.0 km || 
|-id=472 bgcolor=#d6d6d6
| 230472 ||  || — || September 14, 2002 || Palomar || R. Matson || EOS || align=right | 2.7 km || 
|-id=473 bgcolor=#d6d6d6
| 230473 ||  || — || September 27, 2002 || Palomar || NEAT || TIR || align=right | 5.0 km || 
|-id=474 bgcolor=#d6d6d6
| 230474 ||  || — || September 26, 2002 || Palomar || NEAT || EOS || align=right | 2.4 km || 
|-id=475 bgcolor=#d6d6d6
| 230475 ||  || — || September 30, 2002 || Socorro || LINEAR || — || align=right | 5.6 km || 
|-id=476 bgcolor=#fefefe
| 230476 ||  || — || October 1, 2002 || Anderson Mesa || LONEOS || FLO || align=right data-sort-value="0.99" | 990 m || 
|-id=477 bgcolor=#d6d6d6
| 230477 ||  || — || October 1, 2002 || Haleakala || NEAT || URS || align=right | 7.3 km || 
|-id=478 bgcolor=#fefefe
| 230478 ||  || — || October 1, 2002 || Socorro || LINEAR || FLO || align=right | 1.0 km || 
|-id=479 bgcolor=#fefefe
| 230479 ||  || — || October 2, 2002 || Socorro || LINEAR || V || align=right data-sort-value="0.94" | 940 m || 
|-id=480 bgcolor=#fefefe
| 230480 ||  || — || October 2, 2002 || Socorro || LINEAR || — || align=right data-sort-value="0.98" | 980 m || 
|-id=481 bgcolor=#fefefe
| 230481 ||  || — || October 2, 2002 || Socorro || LINEAR || FLO || align=right | 1.1 km || 
|-id=482 bgcolor=#fefefe
| 230482 ||  || — || October 2, 2002 || Socorro || LINEAR || — || align=right | 1.3 km || 
|-id=483 bgcolor=#d6d6d6
| 230483 ||  || — || October 2, 2002 || Kvistaberg || UDAS || — || align=right | 6.2 km || 
|-id=484 bgcolor=#fefefe
| 230484 ||  || — || October 3, 2002 || Palomar || NEAT || V || align=right | 1.1 km || 
|-id=485 bgcolor=#fefefe
| 230485 ||  || — || October 1, 2002 || Anderson Mesa || LONEOS || — || align=right | 1.0 km || 
|-id=486 bgcolor=#d6d6d6
| 230486 ||  || — || October 3, 2002 || Socorro || LINEAR || THM || align=right | 3.0 km || 
|-id=487 bgcolor=#d6d6d6
| 230487 ||  || — || October 3, 2002 || Socorro || LINEAR || EOS || align=right | 3.3 km || 
|-id=488 bgcolor=#fefefe
| 230488 ||  || — || October 3, 2002 || Palomar || NEAT || V || align=right data-sort-value="0.98" | 980 m || 
|-id=489 bgcolor=#fefefe
| 230489 ||  || — || October 4, 2002 || Socorro || LINEAR || — || align=right data-sort-value="0.67" | 670 m || 
|-id=490 bgcolor=#fefefe
| 230490 ||  || — || October 4, 2002 || Palomar || NEAT || FLO || align=right | 1.1 km || 
|-id=491 bgcolor=#fefefe
| 230491 ||  || — || October 2, 2002 || Haleakala || NEAT || — || align=right | 1.4 km || 
|-id=492 bgcolor=#fefefe
| 230492 ||  || — || October 3, 2002 || Socorro || LINEAR || — || align=right | 1.2 km || 
|-id=493 bgcolor=#d6d6d6
| 230493 ||  || — || October 3, 2002 || Palomar || NEAT || — || align=right | 5.3 km || 
|-id=494 bgcolor=#d6d6d6
| 230494 ||  || — || October 4, 2002 || Socorro || LINEAR || — || align=right | 5.7 km || 
|-id=495 bgcolor=#d6d6d6
| 230495 ||  || — || October 6, 2002 || Socorro || LINEAR || URS || align=right | 5.3 km || 
|-id=496 bgcolor=#fefefe
| 230496 ||  || — || October 9, 2002 || Socorro || LINEAR || — || align=right | 1.2 km || 
|-id=497 bgcolor=#fefefe
| 230497 ||  || — || October 9, 2002 || Socorro || LINEAR || — || align=right data-sort-value="0.78" | 780 m || 
|-id=498 bgcolor=#fefefe
| 230498 ||  || — || October 9, 2002 || Socorro || LINEAR || FLO || align=right data-sort-value="0.95" | 950 m || 
|-id=499 bgcolor=#fefefe
| 230499 ||  || — || October 9, 2002 || Socorro || LINEAR || FLO || align=right data-sort-value="0.89" | 890 m || 
|-id=500 bgcolor=#fefefe
| 230500 ||  || — || October 10, 2002 || Socorro || LINEAR || — || align=right | 1.3 km || 
|}

230501–230600 

|-bgcolor=#fefefe
| 230501 ||  || — || October 10, 2002 || Socorro || LINEAR || — || align=right | 1.3 km || 
|-id=502 bgcolor=#fefefe
| 230502 ||  || — || October 10, 2002 || Socorro || LINEAR || FLO || align=right | 1.2 km || 
|-id=503 bgcolor=#d6d6d6
| 230503 ||  || — || October 5, 2002 || Apache Point || SDSS || — || align=right | 3.9 km || 
|-id=504 bgcolor=#fefefe
| 230504 ||  || — || October 28, 2002 || Palomar || NEAT || — || align=right data-sort-value="0.94" | 940 m || 
|-id=505 bgcolor=#d6d6d6
| 230505 ||  || — || October 30, 2002 || Kitt Peak || Spacewatch || 7:4 || align=right | 6.3 km || 
|-id=506 bgcolor=#fefefe
| 230506 ||  || — || October 31, 2002 || Socorro || LINEAR || — || align=right | 1.5 km || 
|-id=507 bgcolor=#fefefe
| 230507 ||  || — || November 1, 2002 || Palomar || NEAT || FLO || align=right data-sort-value="0.99" | 990 m || 
|-id=508 bgcolor=#FA8072
| 230508 ||  || — || November 5, 2002 || Socorro || LINEAR || — || align=right | 1.1 km || 
|-id=509 bgcolor=#fefefe
| 230509 ||  || — || November 4, 2002 || Palomar || NEAT || V || align=right data-sort-value="0.90" | 900 m || 
|-id=510 bgcolor=#fefefe
| 230510 ||  || — || November 5, 2002 || Socorro || LINEAR || FLO || align=right | 1.5 km || 
|-id=511 bgcolor=#fefefe
| 230511 ||  || — || November 5, 2002 || Socorro || LINEAR || — || align=right data-sort-value="0.85" | 850 m || 
|-id=512 bgcolor=#fefefe
| 230512 ||  || — || November 1, 2002 || Palomar || NEAT || — || align=right data-sort-value="0.91" | 910 m || 
|-id=513 bgcolor=#fefefe
| 230513 ||  || — || November 6, 2002 || Anderson Mesa || LONEOS || — || align=right | 1.3 km || 
|-id=514 bgcolor=#fefefe
| 230514 ||  || — || November 3, 2002 || Haleakala || NEAT || FLO || align=right data-sort-value="0.72" | 720 m || 
|-id=515 bgcolor=#fefefe
| 230515 ||  || — || November 12, 2002 || Socorro || LINEAR || — || align=right | 1.0 km || 
|-id=516 bgcolor=#fefefe
| 230516 ||  || — || November 12, 2002 || Socorro || LINEAR || V || align=right | 1.1 km || 
|-id=517 bgcolor=#fefefe
| 230517 ||  || — || November 12, 2002 || Socorro || LINEAR || — || align=right | 1.2 km || 
|-id=518 bgcolor=#fefefe
| 230518 ||  || — || November 12, 2002 || Socorro || LINEAR || V || align=right data-sort-value="0.87" | 870 m || 
|-id=519 bgcolor=#fefefe
| 230519 ||  || — || November 24, 2002 || Palomar || NEAT || — || align=right | 1.8 km || 
|-id=520 bgcolor=#fefefe
| 230520 ||  || — || November 24, 2002 || Palomar || NEAT || — || align=right | 1.1 km || 
|-id=521 bgcolor=#fefefe
| 230521 ||  || — || November 27, 2002 || Anderson Mesa || LONEOS || PHO || align=right | 1.4 km || 
|-id=522 bgcolor=#fefefe
| 230522 ||  || — || November 24, 2002 || Palomar || S. F. Hönig || — || align=right data-sort-value="0.79" | 790 m || 
|-id=523 bgcolor=#fefefe
| 230523 ||  || — || November 24, 2002 || Palomar || S. F. Hönig || — || align=right data-sort-value="0.98" | 980 m || 
|-id=524 bgcolor=#fefefe
| 230524 ||  || — || November 25, 2002 || Palomar || S. F. Hönig || NYS || align=right data-sort-value="0.91" | 910 m || 
|-id=525 bgcolor=#fefefe
| 230525 ||  || — || December 1, 2002 || Socorro || LINEAR || — || align=right | 1.2 km || 
|-id=526 bgcolor=#fefefe
| 230526 ||  || — || December 3, 2002 || Palomar || NEAT || V || align=right data-sort-value="0.89" | 890 m || 
|-id=527 bgcolor=#fefefe
| 230527 ||  || — || December 5, 2002 || Socorro || LINEAR || FLO || align=right | 1.2 km || 
|-id=528 bgcolor=#fefefe
| 230528 ||  || — || December 5, 2002 || Anderson Mesa || LONEOS || — || align=right | 1.0 km || 
|-id=529 bgcolor=#fefefe
| 230529 ||  || — || December 5, 2002 || Socorro || LINEAR || FLO || align=right | 1.2 km || 
|-id=530 bgcolor=#fefefe
| 230530 ||  || — || December 5, 2002 || Fountain Hills || C. W. Juels, P. R. Holvorcem || PHO || align=right | 1.6 km || 
|-id=531 bgcolor=#fefefe
| 230531 ||  || — || December 10, 2002 || Socorro || LINEAR || — || align=right data-sort-value="0.72" | 720 m || 
|-id=532 bgcolor=#fefefe
| 230532 ||  || — || December 11, 2002 || Socorro || LINEAR || FLO || align=right | 1.3 km || 
|-id=533 bgcolor=#fefefe
| 230533 ||  || — || December 5, 2002 || Socorro || LINEAR || — || align=right data-sort-value="0.88" | 880 m || 
|-id=534 bgcolor=#d6d6d6
| 230534 ||  || — || December 5, 2002 || Socorro || LINEAR || — || align=right | 4.1 km || 
|-id=535 bgcolor=#fefefe
| 230535 ||  || — || December 5, 2002 || Socorro || LINEAR || — || align=right | 1.2 km || 
|-id=536 bgcolor=#fefefe
| 230536 ||  || — || December 27, 2002 || Anderson Mesa || LONEOS || — || align=right | 1.0 km || 
|-id=537 bgcolor=#fefefe
| 230537 ||  || — || December 31, 2002 || Kitt Peak || Spacewatch || FLO || align=right data-sort-value="0.98" | 980 m || 
|-id=538 bgcolor=#fefefe
| 230538 ||  || — || December 31, 2002 || Socorro || LINEAR || FLO || align=right data-sort-value="0.98" | 980 m || 
|-id=539 bgcolor=#fefefe
| 230539 ||  || — || December 31, 2002 || Socorro || LINEAR || — || align=right | 1.1 km || 
|-id=540 bgcolor=#fefefe
| 230540 ||  || — || December 31, 2002 || Socorro || LINEAR || — || align=right | 1.1 km || 
|-id=541 bgcolor=#fefefe
| 230541 ||  || — || December 31, 2002 || Socorro || LINEAR || — || align=right | 1.3 km || 
|-id=542 bgcolor=#fefefe
| 230542 ||  || — || January 2, 2003 || Socorro || LINEAR || — || align=right | 1.3 km || 
|-id=543 bgcolor=#fefefe
| 230543 ||  || — || January 3, 2003 || Socorro || LINEAR || PHO || align=right | 1.6 km || 
|-id=544 bgcolor=#fefefe
| 230544 ||  || — || January 5, 2003 || Socorro || LINEAR || — || align=right | 1.0 km || 
|-id=545 bgcolor=#fefefe
| 230545 ||  || — || January 7, 2003 || Socorro || LINEAR || FLO || align=right | 1.1 km || 
|-id=546 bgcolor=#fefefe
| 230546 ||  || — || January 8, 2003 || Socorro || LINEAR || V || align=right | 1.2 km || 
|-id=547 bgcolor=#fefefe
| 230547 ||  || — || January 8, 2003 || Socorro || LINEAR || — || align=right | 1.0 km || 
|-id=548 bgcolor=#fefefe
| 230548 ||  || — || January 5, 2003 || Anderson Mesa || LONEOS || V || align=right | 1.0 km || 
|-id=549 bgcolor=#FFC2E0
| 230549 || 2003 BH || — || January 18, 2003 || Haleakala || NEAT || APOPHA || align=right data-sort-value="0.22" | 220 m || 
|-id=550 bgcolor=#fefefe
| 230550 || 2003 BM || — || January 21, 2003 || Wrightwood || J. W. Young || — || align=right data-sort-value="0.79" | 790 m || 
|-id=551 bgcolor=#fefefe
| 230551 ||  || — || January 25, 2003 || Anderson Mesa || LONEOS || — || align=right | 1.3 km || 
|-id=552 bgcolor=#fefefe
| 230552 ||  || — || January 26, 2003 || Anderson Mesa || LONEOS || — || align=right | 1.0 km || 
|-id=553 bgcolor=#fefefe
| 230553 ||  || — || January 26, 2003 || Anderson Mesa || LONEOS || — || align=right | 1.1 km || 
|-id=554 bgcolor=#fefefe
| 230554 ||  || — || January 26, 2003 || Anderson Mesa || LONEOS || — || align=right | 1.5 km || 
|-id=555 bgcolor=#fefefe
| 230555 ||  || — || January 26, 2003 || Anderson Mesa || LONEOS || FLO || align=right | 1.1 km || 
|-id=556 bgcolor=#fefefe
| 230556 ||  || — || January 26, 2003 || Anderson Mesa || LONEOS || — || align=right | 1.2 km || 
|-id=557 bgcolor=#fefefe
| 230557 ||  || — || January 25, 2003 || Palomar || NEAT || — || align=right | 1.6 km || 
|-id=558 bgcolor=#fefefe
| 230558 ||  || — || January 26, 2003 || Anderson Mesa || LONEOS || — || align=right | 1.4 km || 
|-id=559 bgcolor=#fefefe
| 230559 ||  || — || January 27, 2003 || Socorro || LINEAR || — || align=right | 1.0 km || 
|-id=560 bgcolor=#fefefe
| 230560 ||  || — || January 28, 2003 || Palomar || NEAT || — || align=right | 1.4 km || 
|-id=561 bgcolor=#d6d6d6
| 230561 ||  || — || January 28, 2003 || Haleakala || NEAT || BRA || align=right | 2.2 km || 
|-id=562 bgcolor=#fefefe
| 230562 ||  || — || January 27, 2003 || Socorro || LINEAR || — || align=right data-sort-value="0.90" | 900 m || 
|-id=563 bgcolor=#fefefe
| 230563 ||  || — || January 27, 2003 || Socorro || LINEAR || — || align=right | 2.5 km || 
|-id=564 bgcolor=#fefefe
| 230564 ||  || — || January 27, 2003 || Palomar || NEAT || — || align=right | 1.2 km || 
|-id=565 bgcolor=#fefefe
| 230565 ||  || — || January 27, 2003 || Haleakala || NEAT || FLO || align=right | 1.1 km || 
|-id=566 bgcolor=#fefefe
| 230566 ||  || — || January 27, 2003 || Socorro || LINEAR || — || align=right | 1.1 km || 
|-id=567 bgcolor=#fefefe
| 230567 ||  || — || January 27, 2003 || Socorro || LINEAR || — || align=right | 1.2 km || 
|-id=568 bgcolor=#fefefe
| 230568 ||  || — || January 27, 2003 || Socorro || LINEAR || MAS || align=right data-sort-value="0.99" | 990 m || 
|-id=569 bgcolor=#fefefe
| 230569 ||  || — || January 27, 2003 || Socorro || LINEAR || — || align=right | 1.2 km || 
|-id=570 bgcolor=#fefefe
| 230570 ||  || — || January 30, 2003 || Anderson Mesa || LONEOS || NYS || align=right data-sort-value="0.87" | 870 m || 
|-id=571 bgcolor=#fefefe
| 230571 ||  || — || January 30, 2003 || Anderson Mesa || LONEOS || — || align=right data-sort-value="0.90" | 900 m || 
|-id=572 bgcolor=#fefefe
| 230572 ||  || — || January 30, 2003 || Anderson Mesa || LONEOS || NYS || align=right data-sort-value="0.92" | 920 m || 
|-id=573 bgcolor=#fefefe
| 230573 ||  || — || January 31, 2003 || Socorro || LINEAR || — || align=right data-sort-value="0.88" | 880 m || 
|-id=574 bgcolor=#fefefe
| 230574 ||  || — || January 31, 2003 || Socorro || LINEAR || NYS || align=right data-sort-value="0.72" | 720 m || 
|-id=575 bgcolor=#fefefe
| 230575 ||  || — || January 31, 2003 || Socorro || LINEAR || — || align=right | 1.3 km || 
|-id=576 bgcolor=#fefefe
| 230576 ||  || — || January 27, 2003 || Socorro || LINEAR || — || align=right | 1.4 km || 
|-id=577 bgcolor=#fefefe
| 230577 ||  || — || January 28, 2003 || Socorro || LINEAR || — || align=right | 1.4 km || 
|-id=578 bgcolor=#fefefe
| 230578 ||  || — || February 2, 2003 || Anderson Mesa || LONEOS || FLO || align=right | 1.0 km || 
|-id=579 bgcolor=#fefefe
| 230579 ||  || — || February 2, 2003 || Palomar || NEAT || — || align=right | 1.8 km || 
|-id=580 bgcolor=#fefefe
| 230580 ||  || — || February 1, 2003 || Anderson Mesa || LONEOS || — || align=right | 1.2 km || 
|-id=581 bgcolor=#fefefe
| 230581 ||  || — || February 1, 2003 || Socorro || LINEAR || ERI || align=right | 1.9 km || 
|-id=582 bgcolor=#fefefe
| 230582 ||  || — || February 2, 2003 || Socorro || LINEAR || ERI || align=right | 2.5 km || 
|-id=583 bgcolor=#fefefe
| 230583 ||  || — || February 7, 2003 || Desert Eagle || W. K. Y. Yeung || FLO || align=right data-sort-value="0.71" | 710 m || 
|-id=584 bgcolor=#fefefe
| 230584 ||  || — || February 21, 2003 || Palomar || NEAT || MAS || align=right data-sort-value="0.98" | 980 m || 
|-id=585 bgcolor=#fefefe
| 230585 ||  || — || February 19, 2003 || Palomar || NEAT || — || align=right | 1.1 km || 
|-id=586 bgcolor=#fefefe
| 230586 ||  || — || February 21, 2003 || Palomar || NEAT || — || align=right | 1.1 km || 
|-id=587 bgcolor=#fefefe
| 230587 ||  || — || February 22, 2003 || Palomar || NEAT || V || align=right data-sort-value="0.90" | 900 m || 
|-id=588 bgcolor=#fefefe
| 230588 ||  || — || February 22, 2003 || Palomar || NEAT || NYS || align=right data-sort-value="0.90" | 900 m || 
|-id=589 bgcolor=#fefefe
| 230589 ||  || — || March 6, 2003 || Socorro || LINEAR || — || align=right | 1.3 km || 
|-id=590 bgcolor=#fefefe
| 230590 ||  || — || March 6, 2003 || Palomar || NEAT || NYS || align=right data-sort-value="0.86" | 860 m || 
|-id=591 bgcolor=#fefefe
| 230591 ||  || — || March 6, 2003 || Anderson Mesa || LONEOS || NYS || align=right data-sort-value="0.89" | 890 m || 
|-id=592 bgcolor=#fefefe
| 230592 ||  || — || March 6, 2003 || Socorro || LINEAR || NYS || align=right | 1.0 km || 
|-id=593 bgcolor=#fefefe
| 230593 ||  || — || March 6, 2003 || Socorro || LINEAR || — || align=right | 1.1 km || 
|-id=594 bgcolor=#fefefe
| 230594 ||  || — || March 7, 2003 || Kitt Peak || Spacewatch || — || align=right data-sort-value="0.92" | 920 m || 
|-id=595 bgcolor=#fefefe
| 230595 ||  || — || March 7, 2003 || Anderson Mesa || LONEOS || NYS || align=right data-sort-value="0.75" | 750 m || 
|-id=596 bgcolor=#fefefe
| 230596 ||  || — || March 7, 2003 || Socorro || LINEAR || — || align=right | 1.0 km || 
|-id=597 bgcolor=#fefefe
| 230597 ||  || — || March 7, 2003 || Socorro || LINEAR || ERI || align=right | 2.3 km || 
|-id=598 bgcolor=#fefefe
| 230598 ||  || — || March 11, 2003 || Palomar || NEAT || — || align=right | 2.5 km || 
|-id=599 bgcolor=#FFC2E0
| 230599 ||  || — || March 24, 2003 || Socorro || LINEAR || APO +1km || align=right data-sort-value="0.97" | 970 m || 
|-id=600 bgcolor=#fefefe
| 230600 ||  || — || March 30, 2003 || Desert Moon || B. L. Stevens || NYS || align=right data-sort-value="0.89" | 890 m || 
|}

230601–230700 

|-bgcolor=#fefefe
| 230601 ||  || — || March 22, 2003 || Kvistaberg || UDAS || — || align=right | 1.3 km || 
|-id=602 bgcolor=#fefefe
| 230602 ||  || — || March 23, 2003 || Kitt Peak || Spacewatch || NYS || align=right | 1.2 km || 
|-id=603 bgcolor=#E9E9E9
| 230603 ||  || — || March 25, 2003 || Kitt Peak || Spacewatch || — || align=right | 1.9 km || 
|-id=604 bgcolor=#fefefe
| 230604 ||  || — || March 24, 2003 || Kitt Peak || Spacewatch || — || align=right | 1.9 km || 
|-id=605 bgcolor=#fefefe
| 230605 ||  || — || March 23, 2003 || Kitt Peak || Spacewatch || — || align=right data-sort-value="0.94" | 940 m || 
|-id=606 bgcolor=#fefefe
| 230606 ||  || — || March 25, 2003 || Palomar || NEAT || V || align=right | 1.0 km || 
|-id=607 bgcolor=#fefefe
| 230607 ||  || — || March 25, 2003 || Catalina || CSS || — || align=right | 1.5 km || 
|-id=608 bgcolor=#E9E9E9
| 230608 ||  || — || March 25, 2003 || Haleakala || NEAT || RAF || align=right | 1.3 km || 
|-id=609 bgcolor=#fefefe
| 230609 ||  || — || March 26, 2003 || Palomar || NEAT || — || align=right | 1.2 km || 
|-id=610 bgcolor=#fefefe
| 230610 ||  || — || March 26, 2003 || Haleakala || NEAT || NYS || align=right | 1.1 km || 
|-id=611 bgcolor=#fefefe
| 230611 ||  || — || March 27, 2003 || Palomar || NEAT || — || align=right | 1.2 km || 
|-id=612 bgcolor=#fefefe
| 230612 ||  || — || March 27, 2003 || Socorro || LINEAR || ERI || align=right | 3.0 km || 
|-id=613 bgcolor=#fefefe
| 230613 ||  || — || March 27, 2003 || Socorro || LINEAR || — || align=right | 1.2 km || 
|-id=614 bgcolor=#fefefe
| 230614 ||  || — || March 27, 2003 || Catalina || CSS || — || align=right | 1.2 km || 
|-id=615 bgcolor=#fefefe
| 230615 ||  || — || March 28, 2003 || Kitt Peak || Spacewatch || NYS || align=right | 1.1 km || 
|-id=616 bgcolor=#fefefe
| 230616 ||  || — || March 31, 2003 || Anderson Mesa || LONEOS || — || align=right | 1.4 km || 
|-id=617 bgcolor=#fefefe
| 230617 ||  || — || March 26, 2003 || Kitt Peak || Spacewatch || fast? || align=right data-sort-value="0.98" | 980 m || 
|-id=618 bgcolor=#fefefe
| 230618 ||  || — || March 24, 2003 || Kitt Peak || Spacewatch || NYS || align=right | 2.7 km || 
|-id=619 bgcolor=#fefefe
| 230619 ||  || — || March 26, 2003 || Anderson Mesa || LONEOS || NYS || align=right | 1.1 km || 
|-id=620 bgcolor=#fefefe
| 230620 ||  || — || March 27, 2003 || Kitt Peak || Spacewatch || NYS || align=right data-sort-value="0.79" | 790 m || 
|-id=621 bgcolor=#fefefe
| 230621 ||  || — || March 31, 2003 || Anderson Mesa || LONEOS || — || align=right | 1.2 km || 
|-id=622 bgcolor=#fefefe
| 230622 ||  || — || April 2, 2003 || Haleakala || NEAT || — || align=right | 1.3 km || 
|-id=623 bgcolor=#fefefe
| 230623 ||  || — || April 6, 2003 || Kitt Peak || Spacewatch || — || align=right | 1.3 km || 
|-id=624 bgcolor=#fefefe
| 230624 ||  || — || April 8, 2003 || Socorro || LINEAR || — || align=right | 1.3 km || 
|-id=625 bgcolor=#fefefe
| 230625 ||  || — || April 26, 2003 || Haleakala || NEAT || — || align=right | 1.3 km || 
|-id=626 bgcolor=#fefefe
| 230626 ||  || — || April 25, 2003 || Kitt Peak || Spacewatch || — || align=right data-sort-value="0.99" | 990 m || 
|-id=627 bgcolor=#fefefe
| 230627 ||  || — || April 29, 2003 || Socorro || LINEAR || MAS || align=right | 1.0 km || 
|-id=628 bgcolor=#fefefe
| 230628 ||  || — || April 24, 2003 || Anderson Mesa || LONEOS || NYS || align=right data-sort-value="0.91" | 910 m || 
|-id=629 bgcolor=#fefefe
| 230629 ||  || — || April 29, 2003 || Anderson Mesa || LONEOS || — || align=right | 1.4 km || 
|-id=630 bgcolor=#E9E9E9
| 230630 ||  || — || May 30, 2003 || Socorro || LINEAR || EUN || align=right | 2.0 km || 
|-id=631 bgcolor=#E9E9E9
| 230631 Justino || 2003 MB ||  || June 18, 2003 || Sierra Nevada || A. Sota || — || align=right | 2.4 km || 
|-id=632 bgcolor=#E9E9E9
| 230632 ||  || — || June 25, 2003 || Socorro || LINEAR || — || align=right | 1.9 km || 
|-id=633 bgcolor=#d6d6d6
| 230633 ||  || — || June 26, 2003 || Socorro || LINEAR || DUR || align=right | 7.4 km || 
|-id=634 bgcolor=#d6d6d6
| 230634 ||  || — || August 19, 2003 || Campo Imperatore || CINEOS || CHA || align=right | 2.8 km || 
|-id=635 bgcolor=#E9E9E9
| 230635 ||  || — || August 18, 2003 || Wise || D. Polishook || — || align=right | 3.9 km || 
|-id=636 bgcolor=#E9E9E9
| 230636 ||  || — || August 21, 2003 || Palomar || NEAT || — || align=right | 2.6 km || 
|-id=637 bgcolor=#E9E9E9
| 230637 ||  || — || August 21, 2003 || Palomar || NEAT || — || align=right | 4.0 km || 
|-id=638 bgcolor=#E9E9E9
| 230638 ||  || — || August 22, 2003 || Palomar || NEAT || ADE || align=right | 4.5 km || 
|-id=639 bgcolor=#E9E9E9
| 230639 ||  || — || August 23, 2003 || Socorro || LINEAR || WIT || align=right | 2.0 km || 
|-id=640 bgcolor=#E9E9E9
| 230640 ||  || — || August 26, 2003 || Socorro || LINEAR || — || align=right | 3.9 km || 
|-id=641 bgcolor=#d6d6d6
| 230641 ||  || — || August 26, 2003 || Socorro || LINEAR || — || align=right | 4.4 km || 
|-id=642 bgcolor=#d6d6d6
| 230642 ||  || — || August 21, 2003 || Campo Imperatore || CINEOS || — || align=right | 2.8 km || 
|-id=643 bgcolor=#E9E9E9
| 230643 ||  || — || September 8, 2003 || Haleakala || NEAT || DOR || align=right | 5.1 km || 
|-id=644 bgcolor=#d6d6d6
| 230644 ||  || — || September 14, 2003 || Haleakala || NEAT || — || align=right | 5.4 km || 
|-id=645 bgcolor=#E9E9E9
| 230645 ||  || — || September 15, 2003 || Palomar || NEAT || AEO || align=right | 1.7 km || 
|-id=646 bgcolor=#E9E9E9
| 230646 ||  || — || September 15, 2003 || Anderson Mesa || LONEOS || AGN || align=right | 2.0 km || 
|-id=647 bgcolor=#d6d6d6
| 230647 ||  || — || September 16, 2003 || Kitt Peak || Spacewatch || — || align=right | 4.7 km || 
|-id=648 bgcolor=#E9E9E9
| 230648 Zikmund ||  ||  || September 17, 2003 || Kleť || KLENOT || — || align=right | 3.0 km || 
|-id=649 bgcolor=#E9E9E9
| 230649 ||  || — || September 18, 2003 || Socorro || LINEAR || AGN || align=right | 1.7 km || 
|-id=650 bgcolor=#E9E9E9
| 230650 ||  || — || September 18, 2003 || Palomar || NEAT || — || align=right | 3.3 km || 
|-id=651 bgcolor=#E9E9E9
| 230651 ||  || — || September 18, 2003 || Palomar || NEAT || AGN || align=right | 2.4 km || 
|-id=652 bgcolor=#d6d6d6
| 230652 ||  || — || September 18, 2003 || Socorro || LINEAR || — || align=right | 5.2 km || 
|-id=653 bgcolor=#E9E9E9
| 230653 ||  || — || September 19, 2003 || Kitt Peak || Spacewatch || — || align=right | 3.0 km || 
|-id=654 bgcolor=#E9E9E9
| 230654 ||  || — || September 19, 2003 || Kitt Peak || Spacewatch || — || align=right | 2.7 km || 
|-id=655 bgcolor=#d6d6d6
| 230655 ||  || — || September 20, 2003 || Palomar || NEAT || EOS || align=right | 2.6 km || 
|-id=656 bgcolor=#d6d6d6
| 230656 Kovácspál ||  ||  || September 19, 2003 || Piszkéstető || K. Sárneczky, B. Sipőcz || — || align=right | 2.6 km || 
|-id=657 bgcolor=#E9E9E9
| 230657 ||  || — || September 16, 2003 || Kitt Peak || Spacewatch || — || align=right | 3.2 km || 
|-id=658 bgcolor=#d6d6d6
| 230658 ||  || — || September 16, 2003 || Palomar || NEAT || — || align=right | 3.2 km || 
|-id=659 bgcolor=#d6d6d6
| 230659 ||  || — || September 16, 2003 || Kitt Peak || Spacewatch || — || align=right | 3.3 km || 
|-id=660 bgcolor=#d6d6d6
| 230660 ||  || — || September 20, 2003 || Palomar || NEAT || 628 || align=right | 3.5 km || 
|-id=661 bgcolor=#d6d6d6
| 230661 ||  || — || September 22, 2003 || Kitt Peak || Spacewatch || — || align=right | 3.9 km || 
|-id=662 bgcolor=#E9E9E9
| 230662 ||  || — || September 19, 2003 || Socorro || LINEAR || — || align=right | 4.4 km || 
|-id=663 bgcolor=#d6d6d6
| 230663 ||  || — || September 22, 2003 || Anderson Mesa || LONEOS || — || align=right | 4.3 km || 
|-id=664 bgcolor=#d6d6d6
| 230664 ||  || — || September 19, 2003 || Palomar || NEAT || EMA || align=right | 5.8 km || 
|-id=665 bgcolor=#d6d6d6
| 230665 ||  || — || September 21, 2003 || Anderson Mesa || LONEOS || TRP || align=right | 4.8 km || 
|-id=666 bgcolor=#d6d6d6
| 230666 ||  || — || September 21, 2003 || Anderson Mesa || LONEOS || — || align=right | 4.3 km || 
|-id=667 bgcolor=#E9E9E9
| 230667 ||  || — || September 25, 2003 || Kleť || J. Tichá, M. Tichý || AGN || align=right | 2.0 km || 
|-id=668 bgcolor=#E9E9E9
| 230668 ||  || — || September 23, 2003 || Sierra Nevada || A. Sota || WIT || align=right | 1.3 km || 
|-id=669 bgcolor=#d6d6d6
| 230669 ||  || — || September 27, 2003 || Desert Eagle || W. K. Y. Yeung || — || align=right | 2.8 km || 
|-id=670 bgcolor=#d6d6d6
| 230670 ||  || — || September 26, 2003 || Socorro || LINEAR || THM || align=right | 3.4 km || 
|-id=671 bgcolor=#E9E9E9
| 230671 ||  || — || September 27, 2003 || Kitt Peak || Spacewatch || HOF || align=right | 4.3 km || 
|-id=672 bgcolor=#d6d6d6
| 230672 ||  || — || September 29, 2003 || Socorro || LINEAR || — || align=right | 3.3 km || 
|-id=673 bgcolor=#d6d6d6
| 230673 ||  || — || September 30, 2003 || Goodricke-Pigott || J. W. Kessel || — || align=right | 5.8 km || 
|-id=674 bgcolor=#E9E9E9
| 230674 ||  || — || September 18, 2003 || Kitt Peak || Spacewatch || — || align=right | 3.6 km || 
|-id=675 bgcolor=#d6d6d6
| 230675 ||  || — || September 20, 2003 || Palomar || NEAT || — || align=right | 3.4 km || 
|-id=676 bgcolor=#d6d6d6
| 230676 ||  || — || September 25, 2003 || Palomar || NEAT || — || align=right | 3.9 km || 
|-id=677 bgcolor=#d6d6d6
| 230677 ||  || — || September 18, 2003 || Haleakala || NEAT || — || align=right | 4.9 km || 
|-id=678 bgcolor=#d6d6d6
| 230678 ||  || — || September 27, 2003 || Socorro || LINEAR || — || align=right | 5.4 km || 
|-id=679 bgcolor=#d6d6d6
| 230679 ||  || — || September 17, 2003 || Kitt Peak || Spacewatch || HYG || align=right | 3.6 km || 
|-id=680 bgcolor=#d6d6d6
| 230680 ||  || — || October 4, 2003 || Kingsnake || J. V. McClusky || — || align=right | 5.3 km || 
|-id=681 bgcolor=#d6d6d6
| 230681 ||  || — || October 5, 2003 || Great Shefford || P. Birtwhistle || — || align=right | 2.7 km || 
|-id=682 bgcolor=#d6d6d6
| 230682 ||  || — || October 15, 2003 || Palomar || NEAT || — || align=right | 4.0 km || 
|-id=683 bgcolor=#d6d6d6
| 230683 ||  || — || October 15, 2003 || Anderson Mesa || LONEOS || — || align=right | 3.9 km || 
|-id=684 bgcolor=#E9E9E9
| 230684 ||  || — || October 2, 2003 || Kitt Peak || Spacewatch || GEF || align=right | 1.6 km || 
|-id=685 bgcolor=#d6d6d6
| 230685 ||  || — || October 2, 2003 || Kitt Peak || Spacewatch || CHA || align=right | 3.1 km || 
|-id=686 bgcolor=#d6d6d6
| 230686 ||  || — || October 3, 2003 || Kitt Peak || Spacewatch || — || align=right | 3.9 km || 
|-id=687 bgcolor=#d6d6d6
| 230687 ||  || — || October 5, 2003 || Kitt Peak || Spacewatch || — || align=right | 4.6 km || 
|-id=688 bgcolor=#E9E9E9
| 230688 ||  || — || October 5, 2003 || Kitt Peak || Spacewatch || — || align=right | 1.2 km || 
|-id=689 bgcolor=#d6d6d6
| 230689 ||  || — || October 16, 2003 || Anderson Mesa || LONEOS || ARM || align=right | 6.3 km || 
|-id=690 bgcolor=#d6d6d6
| 230690 ||  || — || October 16, 2003 || Črni Vrh || Črni Vrh || — || align=right | 4.6 km || 
|-id=691 bgcolor=#d6d6d6
| 230691 Van Vogt ||  ||  || October 18, 2003 || Saint-Sulpice || B. Christophe || — || align=right | 3.0 km || 
|-id=692 bgcolor=#E9E9E9
| 230692 ||  || — || October 16, 2003 || Palomar || NEAT || — || align=right | 2.6 km || 
|-id=693 bgcolor=#d6d6d6
| 230693 ||  || — || October 16, 2003 || Anderson Mesa || LONEOS || — || align=right | 4.0 km || 
|-id=694 bgcolor=#d6d6d6
| 230694 ||  || — || October 18, 2003 || Palomar || NEAT || — || align=right | 5.4 km || 
|-id=695 bgcolor=#d6d6d6
| 230695 ||  || — || October 16, 2003 || Kitt Peak || Spacewatch || EOS || align=right | 2.5 km || 
|-id=696 bgcolor=#d6d6d6
| 230696 ||  || — || October 17, 2003 || Anderson Mesa || LONEOS || — || align=right | 5.8 km || 
|-id=697 bgcolor=#d6d6d6
| 230697 ||  || — || October 16, 2003 || Anderson Mesa || LONEOS || — || align=right | 3.2 km || 
|-id=698 bgcolor=#d6d6d6
| 230698 ||  || — || October 19, 2003 || Socorro || LINEAR || — || align=right | 3.4 km || 
|-id=699 bgcolor=#d6d6d6
| 230699 ||  || — || October 17, 2003 || Anderson Mesa || LONEOS || EOS || align=right | 3.0 km || 
|-id=700 bgcolor=#d6d6d6
| 230700 ||  || — || October 17, 2003 || Anderson Mesa || LONEOS || — || align=right | 3.6 km || 
|}

230701–230800 

|-bgcolor=#d6d6d6
| 230701 ||  || — || October 19, 2003 || Anderson Mesa || LONEOS || URS || align=right | 5.4 km || 
|-id=702 bgcolor=#d6d6d6
| 230702 ||  || — || October 20, 2003 || Kitt Peak || Spacewatch || — || align=right | 1.9 km || 
|-id=703 bgcolor=#d6d6d6
| 230703 ||  || — || October 19, 2003 || Palomar || NEAT || — || align=right | 4.7 km || 
|-id=704 bgcolor=#d6d6d6
| 230704 ||  || — || October 18, 2003 || Kitt Peak || Spacewatch || — || align=right | 3.5 km || 
|-id=705 bgcolor=#E9E9E9
| 230705 ||  || — || October 18, 2003 || Kitt Peak || Spacewatch || — || align=right | 1.1 km || 
|-id=706 bgcolor=#d6d6d6
| 230706 ||  || — || October 19, 2003 || Palomar || NEAT || — || align=right | 2.9 km || 
|-id=707 bgcolor=#d6d6d6
| 230707 ||  || — || October 19, 2003 || Palomar || NEAT || HYG || align=right | 4.4 km || 
|-id=708 bgcolor=#d6d6d6
| 230708 ||  || — || October 20, 2003 || Palomar || NEAT || — || align=right | 6.5 km || 
|-id=709 bgcolor=#d6d6d6
| 230709 ||  || — || October 20, 2003 || Palomar || NEAT || — || align=right | 4.2 km || 
|-id=710 bgcolor=#d6d6d6
| 230710 ||  || — || October 21, 2003 || Socorro || LINEAR || HYG || align=right | 4.3 km || 
|-id=711 bgcolor=#d6d6d6
| 230711 ||  || — || October 18, 2003 || Anderson Mesa || LONEOS || — || align=right | 2.9 km || 
|-id=712 bgcolor=#d6d6d6
| 230712 ||  || — || October 18, 2003 || Anderson Mesa || LONEOS || — || align=right | 4.1 km || 
|-id=713 bgcolor=#d6d6d6
| 230713 ||  || — || October 21, 2003 || Kitt Peak || Spacewatch || — || align=right | 3.2 km || 
|-id=714 bgcolor=#d6d6d6
| 230714 ||  || — || October 21, 2003 || Kitt Peak || Spacewatch || — || align=right | 3.4 km || 
|-id=715 bgcolor=#d6d6d6
| 230715 ||  || — || October 19, 2003 || Kitt Peak || Spacewatch || THM || align=right | 3.0 km || 
|-id=716 bgcolor=#d6d6d6
| 230716 ||  || — || October 22, 2003 || Socorro || LINEAR || — || align=right | 4.8 km || 
|-id=717 bgcolor=#d6d6d6
| 230717 ||  || — || October 22, 2003 || Kitt Peak || Spacewatch || TEL || align=right | 2.1 km || 
|-id=718 bgcolor=#d6d6d6
| 230718 ||  || — || October 22, 2003 || Socorro || LINEAR || EMA || align=right | 5.7 km || 
|-id=719 bgcolor=#d6d6d6
| 230719 ||  || — || October 22, 2003 || Kitt Peak || Spacewatch || HYG || align=right | 5.1 km || 
|-id=720 bgcolor=#d6d6d6
| 230720 ||  || — || October 20, 2003 || Kitt Peak || Spacewatch || HYG || align=right | 4.6 km || 
|-id=721 bgcolor=#d6d6d6
| 230721 ||  || — || October 21, 2003 || Socorro || LINEAR || — || align=right | 3.6 km || 
|-id=722 bgcolor=#d6d6d6
| 230722 ||  || — || October 21, 2003 || Socorro || LINEAR || — || align=right | 3.1 km || 
|-id=723 bgcolor=#d6d6d6
| 230723 ||  || — || October 21, 2003 || Kitt Peak || Spacewatch || — || align=right | 3.2 km || 
|-id=724 bgcolor=#d6d6d6
| 230724 ||  || — || October 24, 2003 || Socorro || LINEAR || — || align=right | 3.5 km || 
|-id=725 bgcolor=#d6d6d6
| 230725 ||  || — || October 24, 2003 || Haleakala || NEAT || — || align=right | 5.1 km || 
|-id=726 bgcolor=#d6d6d6
| 230726 ||  || — || October 28, 2003 || Socorro || LINEAR || — || align=right | 6.6 km || 
|-id=727 bgcolor=#d6d6d6
| 230727 ||  || — || October 27, 2003 || Socorro || LINEAR || — || align=right | 3.4 km || 
|-id=728 bgcolor=#d6d6d6
| 230728 ||  || — || October 22, 2003 || Kitt Peak || M. W. Buie || — || align=right | 2.5 km || 
|-id=729 bgcolor=#d6d6d6
| 230729 ||  || — || October 27, 2003 || Kitt Peak || Spacewatch || — || align=right | 3.0 km || 
|-id=730 bgcolor=#d6d6d6
| 230730 ||  || — || October 22, 2003 || Palomar || NEAT || — || align=right | 4.5 km || 
|-id=731 bgcolor=#d6d6d6
| 230731 ||  || — || October 17, 2003 || Apache Point || SDSS || — || align=right | 4.1 km || 
|-id=732 bgcolor=#d6d6d6
| 230732 ||  || — || November 4, 2003 || Socorro || LINEAR || — || align=right | 7.2 km || 
|-id=733 bgcolor=#d6d6d6
| 230733 ||  || — || November 14, 2003 || Palomar || NEAT || — || align=right | 3.2 km || 
|-id=734 bgcolor=#d6d6d6
| 230734 ||  || — || November 16, 2003 || Catalina || CSS || — || align=right | 3.4 km || 
|-id=735 bgcolor=#d6d6d6
| 230735 ||  || — || November 16, 2003 || Catalina || CSS || — || align=right | 3.0 km || 
|-id=736 bgcolor=#d6d6d6
| 230736 Jalyhome ||  ||  || November 18, 2003 || Begues || Begues Obs. || EOS || align=right | 2.7 km || 
|-id=737 bgcolor=#d6d6d6
| 230737 ||  || — || November 18, 2003 || Wrightwood || J. W. Young || — || align=right | 3.9 km || 
|-id=738 bgcolor=#d6d6d6
| 230738 ||  || — || November 18, 2003 || Kitt Peak || Spacewatch || — || align=right | 5.0 km || 
|-id=739 bgcolor=#d6d6d6
| 230739 ||  || — || November 18, 2003 || Palomar || NEAT || — || align=right | 3.8 km || 
|-id=740 bgcolor=#d6d6d6
| 230740 ||  || — || November 19, 2003 || Socorro || LINEAR || MEL || align=right | 5.5 km || 
|-id=741 bgcolor=#d6d6d6
| 230741 ||  || — || November 16, 2003 || Kitt Peak || Spacewatch || EOS || align=right | 2.9 km || 
|-id=742 bgcolor=#d6d6d6
| 230742 ||  || — || November 16, 2003 || Kitt Peak || Spacewatch || — || align=right | 2.7 km || 
|-id=743 bgcolor=#d6d6d6
| 230743 ||  || — || November 18, 2003 || Kitt Peak || Spacewatch || TIR || align=right | 2.7 km || 
|-id=744 bgcolor=#d6d6d6
| 230744 ||  || — || November 19, 2003 || Kitt Peak || Spacewatch || EOS || align=right | 3.2 km || 
|-id=745 bgcolor=#d6d6d6
| 230745 ||  || — || November 18, 2003 || Kitt Peak || Spacewatch || — || align=right | 3.7 km || 
|-id=746 bgcolor=#d6d6d6
| 230746 ||  || — || November 19, 2003 || Socorro || LINEAR || — || align=right | 4.3 km || 
|-id=747 bgcolor=#d6d6d6
| 230747 ||  || — || November 18, 2003 || Kitt Peak || Spacewatch || — || align=right | 5.0 km || 
|-id=748 bgcolor=#d6d6d6
| 230748 ||  || — || November 21, 2003 || Socorro || LINEAR || — || align=right | 4.1 km || 
|-id=749 bgcolor=#d6d6d6
| 230749 ||  || — || November 20, 2003 || Socorro || LINEAR || — || align=right | 4.0 km || 
|-id=750 bgcolor=#d6d6d6
| 230750 ||  || — || November 20, 2003 || Socorro || LINEAR || — || align=right | 3.1 km || 
|-id=751 bgcolor=#d6d6d6
| 230751 ||  || — || November 20, 2003 || Socorro || LINEAR || — || align=right | 3.1 km || 
|-id=752 bgcolor=#d6d6d6
| 230752 ||  || — || November 21, 2003 || Socorro || LINEAR || — || align=right | 3.4 km || 
|-id=753 bgcolor=#d6d6d6
| 230753 ||  || — || November 29, 2003 || Kitt Peak || Spacewatch || THM || align=right | 4.1 km || 
|-id=754 bgcolor=#d6d6d6
| 230754 ||  || — || November 30, 2003 || Kitt Peak || Spacewatch || — || align=right | 3.4 km || 
|-id=755 bgcolor=#E9E9E9
| 230755 ||  || — || November 19, 2003 || Catalina || CSS || — || align=right | 1.7 km || 
|-id=756 bgcolor=#d6d6d6
| 230756 ||  || — || November 19, 2003 || Palomar || NEAT || — || align=right | 5.0 km || 
|-id=757 bgcolor=#d6d6d6
| 230757 ||  || — || November 20, 2003 || Palomar || NEAT || — || align=right | 5.0 km || 
|-id=758 bgcolor=#d6d6d6
| 230758 ||  || — || November 23, 2003 || Anderson Mesa || LONEOS || — || align=right | 5.3 km || 
|-id=759 bgcolor=#d6d6d6
| 230759 ||  || — || November 23, 2003 || Kitt Peak || M. W. Buie || — || align=right | 6.0 km || 
|-id=760 bgcolor=#d6d6d6
| 230760 ||  || — || November 20, 2003 || Palomar || NEAT || — || align=right | 4.7 km || 
|-id=761 bgcolor=#d6d6d6
| 230761 ||  || — || November 23, 2003 || Catalina || CSS || — || align=right | 5.2 km || 
|-id=762 bgcolor=#d6d6d6
| 230762 ||  || — || November 23, 2003 || Socorro || LINEAR || Tj (2.97) || align=right | 7.4 km || 
|-id=763 bgcolor=#d6d6d6
| 230763 ||  || — || December 1, 2003 || Socorro || LINEAR || — || align=right | 6.0 km || 
|-id=764 bgcolor=#fefefe
| 230764 ||  || — || December 13, 2003 || Socorro || LINEAR || — || align=right | 1.1 km || 
|-id=765 bgcolor=#d6d6d6
| 230765 Alfbester ||  ||  || December 15, 2003 || Saint-Sulpice || B. Christophe || — || align=right | 4.7 km || 
|-id=766 bgcolor=#d6d6d6
| 230766 ||  || — || December 14, 2003 || Palomar || NEAT || — || align=right | 4.0 km || 
|-id=767 bgcolor=#fefefe
| 230767 ||  || — || December 5, 2003 || Socorro || LINEAR || H || align=right | 1.4 km || 
|-id=768 bgcolor=#d6d6d6
| 230768 ||  || — || December 3, 2003 || Socorro || LINEAR || — || align=right | 5.6 km || 
|-id=769 bgcolor=#d6d6d6
| 230769 ||  || — || December 17, 2003 || Socorro || LINEAR || HYG || align=right | 4.2 km || 
|-id=770 bgcolor=#d6d6d6
| 230770 ||  || — || December 17, 2003 || Socorro || LINEAR || HYG || align=right | 4.4 km || 
|-id=771 bgcolor=#d6d6d6
| 230771 ||  || — || December 17, 2003 || Socorro || LINEAR || ALA || align=right | 6.0 km || 
|-id=772 bgcolor=#d6d6d6
| 230772 ||  || — || December 18, 2003 || Socorro || LINEAR || — || align=right | 3.8 km || 
|-id=773 bgcolor=#d6d6d6
| 230773 ||  || — || December 19, 2003 || Socorro || LINEAR || — || align=right | 4.3 km || 
|-id=774 bgcolor=#d6d6d6
| 230774 ||  || — || December 19, 2003 || Socorro || LINEAR || — || align=right | 5.5 km || 
|-id=775 bgcolor=#d6d6d6
| 230775 ||  || — || December 18, 2003 || Socorro || LINEAR || MEL || align=right | 4.7 km || 
|-id=776 bgcolor=#d6d6d6
| 230776 ||  || — || December 18, 2003 || Socorro || LINEAR || — || align=right | 7.1 km || 
|-id=777 bgcolor=#d6d6d6
| 230777 ||  || — || December 21, 2003 || Socorro || LINEAR || HYG || align=right | 4.1 km || 
|-id=778 bgcolor=#d6d6d6
| 230778 ||  || — || December 27, 2003 || Kitt Peak || Spacewatch || TIR || align=right | 4.4 km || 
|-id=779 bgcolor=#d6d6d6
| 230779 ||  || — || December 27, 2003 || Socorro || LINEAR || — || align=right | 4.4 km || 
|-id=780 bgcolor=#d6d6d6
| 230780 ||  || — || December 27, 2003 || Kitt Peak || Spacewatch || — || align=right | 5.0 km || 
|-id=781 bgcolor=#d6d6d6
| 230781 ||  || — || December 28, 2003 || Socorro || LINEAR || MEL || align=right | 6.4 km || 
|-id=782 bgcolor=#d6d6d6
| 230782 ||  || — || December 28, 2003 || Socorro || LINEAR || — || align=right | 3.0 km || 
|-id=783 bgcolor=#d6d6d6
| 230783 ||  || — || December 28, 2003 || Socorro || LINEAR || EUP || align=right | 7.0 km || 
|-id=784 bgcolor=#d6d6d6
| 230784 ||  || — || December 29, 2003 || Catalina || CSS || Tj (2.91) || align=right | 3.9 km || 
|-id=785 bgcolor=#d6d6d6
| 230785 ||  || — || December 29, 2003 || Socorro || LINEAR || URS || align=right | 4.9 km || 
|-id=786 bgcolor=#d6d6d6
| 230786 ||  || — || December 18, 2003 || Socorro || LINEAR || — || align=right | 3.4 km || 
|-id=787 bgcolor=#d6d6d6
| 230787 ||  || — || January 17, 2004 || Palomar || NEAT || 7:4 || align=right | 6.3 km || 
|-id=788 bgcolor=#d6d6d6
| 230788 ||  || — || January 21, 2004 || Socorro || LINEAR || — || align=right | 5.3 km || 
|-id=789 bgcolor=#d6d6d6
| 230789 ||  || — || January 26, 2004 || Anderson Mesa || LONEOS || ALA || align=right | 6.5 km || 
|-id=790 bgcolor=#fefefe
| 230790 ||  || — || January 27, 2004 || Kitt Peak || Spacewatch || — || align=right | 1.4 km || 
|-id=791 bgcolor=#d6d6d6
| 230791 ||  || — || January 28, 2004 || Kitt Peak || Spacewatch || — || align=right | 6.1 km || 
|-id=792 bgcolor=#fefefe
| 230792 ||  || — || January 29, 2004 || Anderson Mesa || LONEOS || V || align=right | 1.1 km || 
|-id=793 bgcolor=#d6d6d6
| 230793 ||  || — || January 19, 2004 || Kitt Peak || Spacewatch || — || align=right | 4.3 km || 
|-id=794 bgcolor=#d6d6d6
| 230794 ||  || — || January 16, 2004 || Kitt Peak || Spacewatch || — || align=right | 4.3 km || 
|-id=795 bgcolor=#d6d6d6
| 230795 ||  || — || February 18, 2004 || Kitt Peak || Spacewatch || ALA || align=right | 3.9 km || 
|-id=796 bgcolor=#fefefe
| 230796 || 2004 EJ || — || March 10, 2004 || Palomar || NEAT || V || align=right | 1.1 km || 
|-id=797 bgcolor=#fefefe
| 230797 ||  || — || March 11, 2004 || Palomar || NEAT || FLO || align=right | 1.0 km || 
|-id=798 bgcolor=#fefefe
| 230798 ||  || — || March 13, 2004 || Palomar || NEAT || FLO || align=right data-sort-value="0.85" | 850 m || 
|-id=799 bgcolor=#fefefe
| 230799 ||  || — || March 15, 2004 || Palomar || NEAT || — || align=right | 1.2 km || 
|-id=800 bgcolor=#d6d6d6
| 230800 ||  || — || March 12, 2004 || Palomar || NEAT || — || align=right | 3.1 km || 
|}

230801–230900 

|-bgcolor=#fefefe
| 230801 ||  || — || March 15, 2004 || Palomar || NEAT || FLO || align=right | 1.1 km || 
|-id=802 bgcolor=#fefefe
| 230802 ||  || — || March 16, 2004 || Kitt Peak || Spacewatch || V || align=right | 1.0 km || 
|-id=803 bgcolor=#fefefe
| 230803 ||  || — || March 18, 2004 || Kitt Peak || Spacewatch || — || align=right | 1.7 km || 
|-id=804 bgcolor=#fefefe
| 230804 ||  || — || March 20, 2004 || Socorro || LINEAR || — || align=right | 1.2 km || 
|-id=805 bgcolor=#fefefe
| 230805 ||  || — || March 23, 2004 || Socorro || LINEAR || — || align=right | 1.4 km || 
|-id=806 bgcolor=#fefefe
| 230806 ||  || — || March 23, 2004 || Socorro || LINEAR || — || align=right | 1.1 km || 
|-id=807 bgcolor=#fefefe
| 230807 ||  || — || March 27, 2004 || Anderson Mesa || LONEOS || — || align=right | 1.3 km || 
|-id=808 bgcolor=#fefefe
| 230808 ||  || — || April 11, 2004 || Palomar || NEAT || FLO || align=right | 1.6 km || 
|-id=809 bgcolor=#fefefe
| 230809 ||  || — || April 9, 2004 || Siding Spring || SSS || — || align=right | 1.1 km || 
|-id=810 bgcolor=#fefefe
| 230810 ||  || — || April 20, 2004 || Reedy Creek || J. Broughton || — || align=right | 1.3 km || 
|-id=811 bgcolor=#fefefe
| 230811 ||  || — || April 17, 2004 || Socorro || LINEAR || FLO || align=right data-sort-value="0.88" | 880 m || 
|-id=812 bgcolor=#fefefe
| 230812 ||  || — || April 17, 2004 || Socorro || LINEAR || — || align=right | 1.3 km || 
|-id=813 bgcolor=#E9E9E9
| 230813 ||  || — || April 23, 2004 || Kitt Peak || Spacewatch || — || align=right | 1.9 km || 
|-id=814 bgcolor=#fefefe
| 230814 ||  || — || May 9, 2004 || Kitt Peak || Spacewatch || FLO || align=right | 1.5 km || 
|-id=815 bgcolor=#fefefe
| 230815 ||  || — || May 13, 2004 || Anderson Mesa || LONEOS || NYS || align=right data-sort-value="0.84" | 840 m || 
|-id=816 bgcolor=#fefefe
| 230816 ||  || — || May 15, 2004 || Socorro || LINEAR || — || align=right | 1.1 km || 
|-id=817 bgcolor=#fefefe
| 230817 ||  || — || May 15, 2004 || Socorro || LINEAR || FLO || align=right data-sort-value="0.78" | 780 m || 
|-id=818 bgcolor=#fefefe
| 230818 ||  || — || May 15, 2004 || Socorro || LINEAR || FLO || align=right data-sort-value="0.83" | 830 m || 
|-id=819 bgcolor=#fefefe
| 230819 ||  || — || June 11, 2004 || Socorro || LINEAR || — || align=right | 1.2 km || 
|-id=820 bgcolor=#E9E9E9
| 230820 ||  || — || June 11, 2004 || Socorro || LINEAR || — || align=right | 1.9 km || 
|-id=821 bgcolor=#fefefe
| 230821 ||  || — || June 12, 2004 || Siding Spring || SSS || — || align=right | 2.5 km || 
|-id=822 bgcolor=#E9E9E9
| 230822 ||  || — || June 11, 2004 || Socorro || LINEAR || — || align=right | 2.1 km || 
|-id=823 bgcolor=#E9E9E9
| 230823 ||  || — || June 21, 2004 || Reedy Creek || J. Broughton || — || align=right | 1.5 km || 
|-id=824 bgcolor=#E9E9E9
| 230824 ||  || — || July 11, 2004 || Socorro || LINEAR || — || align=right | 1.8 km || 
|-id=825 bgcolor=#fefefe
| 230825 ||  || — || July 11, 2004 || Socorro || LINEAR || FLO || align=right data-sort-value="0.86" | 860 m || 
|-id=826 bgcolor=#fefefe
| 230826 ||  || — || July 11, 2004 || Socorro || LINEAR || SUL || align=right | 2.8 km || 
|-id=827 bgcolor=#E9E9E9
| 230827 ||  || — || July 11, 2004 || Socorro || LINEAR || — || align=right | 3.6 km || 
|-id=828 bgcolor=#fefefe
| 230828 ||  || — || July 19, 2004 || Anderson Mesa || LONEOS || MAS || align=right | 1.1 km || 
|-id=829 bgcolor=#fefefe
| 230829 ||  || — || August 7, 2004 || Palomar || NEAT || — || align=right | 1.0 km || 
|-id=830 bgcolor=#fefefe
| 230830 ||  || — || August 8, 2004 || Socorro || LINEAR || V || align=right data-sort-value="0.99" | 990 m || 
|-id=831 bgcolor=#E9E9E9
| 230831 ||  || — || August 9, 2004 || Anderson Mesa || LONEOS || — || align=right | 3.0 km || 
|-id=832 bgcolor=#E9E9E9
| 230832 ||  || — || August 9, 2004 || Socorro || LINEAR || — || align=right | 3.9 km || 
|-id=833 bgcolor=#E9E9E9
| 230833 ||  || — || August 7, 2004 || Palomar || NEAT || — || align=right | 3.6 km || 
|-id=834 bgcolor=#E9E9E9
| 230834 ||  || — || August 8, 2004 || Palomar || NEAT || — || align=right | 1.5 km || 
|-id=835 bgcolor=#fefefe
| 230835 ||  || — || August 8, 2004 || Socorro || LINEAR || — || align=right | 1.2 km || 
|-id=836 bgcolor=#d6d6d6
| 230836 ||  || — || August 10, 2004 || Anderson Mesa || LONEOS || — || align=right | 3.9 km || 
|-id=837 bgcolor=#E9E9E9
| 230837 ||  || — || August 11, 2004 || Palomar || NEAT || — || align=right | 2.6 km || 
|-id=838 bgcolor=#E9E9E9
| 230838 ||  || — || August 10, 2004 || Socorro || LINEAR || — || align=right | 3.5 km || 
|-id=839 bgcolor=#E9E9E9
| 230839 ||  || — || August 12, 2004 || Socorro || LINEAR || — || align=right | 3.4 km || 
|-id=840 bgcolor=#fefefe
| 230840 ||  || — || August 21, 2004 || Catalina || CSS || V || align=right data-sort-value="0.93" | 930 m || 
|-id=841 bgcolor=#E9E9E9
| 230841 ||  || — || August 22, 2004 || Kitt Peak || Spacewatch || — || align=right | 2.9 km || 
|-id=842 bgcolor=#E9E9E9
| 230842 ||  || — || August 21, 2004 || Siding Spring || SSS || — || align=right | 3.7 km || 
|-id=843 bgcolor=#E9E9E9
| 230843 ||  || — || August 20, 2004 || Catalina || CSS || INO || align=right | 1.4 km || 
|-id=844 bgcolor=#E9E9E9
| 230844 || 2004 RR || — || September 3, 2004 || Palomar || NEAT || — || align=right | 2.2 km || 
|-id=845 bgcolor=#fefefe
| 230845 ||  || — || September 7, 2004 || Kitt Peak || Spacewatch || NYS || align=right data-sort-value="0.82" | 820 m || 
|-id=846 bgcolor=#fefefe
| 230846 ||  || — || September 7, 2004 || Kitt Peak || Spacewatch || NYS || align=right data-sort-value="0.95" | 950 m || 
|-id=847 bgcolor=#E9E9E9
| 230847 ||  || — || September 7, 2004 || Socorro || LINEAR || — || align=right | 1.3 km || 
|-id=848 bgcolor=#E9E9E9
| 230848 ||  || — || September 7, 2004 || Kitt Peak || Spacewatch || — || align=right | 2.2 km || 
|-id=849 bgcolor=#E9E9E9
| 230849 ||  || — || September 8, 2004 || Socorro || LINEAR || — || align=right | 1.1 km || 
|-id=850 bgcolor=#fefefe
| 230850 ||  || — || September 8, 2004 || Socorro || LINEAR || — || align=right | 1.5 km || 
|-id=851 bgcolor=#fefefe
| 230851 ||  || — || September 8, 2004 || Socorro || LINEAR || NYS || align=right data-sort-value="0.92" | 920 m || 
|-id=852 bgcolor=#E9E9E9
| 230852 ||  || — || September 8, 2004 || Socorro || LINEAR || — || align=right | 1.0 km || 
|-id=853 bgcolor=#E9E9E9
| 230853 ||  || — || September 9, 2004 || Kleť || Kleť Obs. || — || align=right | 2.2 km || 
|-id=854 bgcolor=#E9E9E9
| 230854 ||  || — || September 8, 2004 || Socorro || LINEAR || EUN || align=right | 1.6 km || 
|-id=855 bgcolor=#fefefe
| 230855 ||  || — || September 8, 2004 || Socorro || LINEAR || — || align=right | 1.6 km || 
|-id=856 bgcolor=#E9E9E9
| 230856 ||  || — || September 8, 2004 || Palomar || NEAT || — || align=right | 3.4 km || 
|-id=857 bgcolor=#E9E9E9
| 230857 ||  || — || September 7, 2004 || Kitt Peak || Spacewatch || — || align=right | 1.6 km || 
|-id=858 bgcolor=#fefefe
| 230858 ||  || — || September 10, 2004 || Socorro || LINEAR || PHO || align=right | 2.1 km || 
|-id=859 bgcolor=#E9E9E9
| 230859 ||  || — || September 11, 2004 || Socorro || LINEAR || — || align=right | 4.6 km || 
|-id=860 bgcolor=#fefefe
| 230860 ||  || — || September 6, 2004 || Palomar || NEAT || — || align=right | 1.1 km || 
|-id=861 bgcolor=#E9E9E9
| 230861 ||  || — || September 10, 2004 || Socorro || LINEAR || EUN || align=right | 2.2 km || 
|-id=862 bgcolor=#fefefe
| 230862 ||  || — || September 10, 2004 || Socorro || LINEAR || — || align=right | 1.3 km || 
|-id=863 bgcolor=#fefefe
| 230863 ||  || — || September 10, 2004 || Socorro || LINEAR || — || align=right | 2.1 km || 
|-id=864 bgcolor=#E9E9E9
| 230864 ||  || — || September 10, 2004 || Socorro || LINEAR || — || align=right | 1.6 km || 
|-id=865 bgcolor=#E9E9E9
| 230865 ||  || — || September 10, 2004 || Socorro || LINEAR || — || align=right | 2.1 km || 
|-id=866 bgcolor=#E9E9E9
| 230866 ||  || — || September 10, 2004 || Socorro || LINEAR || EUN || align=right | 2.5 km || 
|-id=867 bgcolor=#d6d6d6
| 230867 ||  || — || September 10, 2004 || Socorro || LINEAR || — || align=right | 4.9 km || 
|-id=868 bgcolor=#E9E9E9
| 230868 ||  || — || September 10, 2004 || Socorro || LINEAR || — || align=right | 3.2 km || 
|-id=869 bgcolor=#E9E9E9
| 230869 ||  || — || September 10, 2004 || Socorro || LINEAR || — || align=right | 3.0 km || 
|-id=870 bgcolor=#fefefe
| 230870 ||  || — || September 10, 2004 || Kitt Peak || Spacewatch || — || align=right | 1.2 km || 
|-id=871 bgcolor=#E9E9E9
| 230871 ||  || — || September 10, 2004 || Socorro || LINEAR || — || align=right | 2.8 km || 
|-id=872 bgcolor=#E9E9E9
| 230872 ||  || — || September 10, 2004 || Socorro || LINEAR || slow || align=right | 4.4 km || 
|-id=873 bgcolor=#E9E9E9
| 230873 ||  || — || September 11, 2004 || Socorro || LINEAR || — || align=right | 4.2 km || 
|-id=874 bgcolor=#E9E9E9
| 230874 ||  || — || September 11, 2004 || Socorro || LINEAR || MAR || align=right | 1.3 km || 
|-id=875 bgcolor=#E9E9E9
| 230875 ||  || — || September 11, 2004 || Socorro || LINEAR || — || align=right | 2.0 km || 
|-id=876 bgcolor=#E9E9E9
| 230876 ||  || — || September 11, 2004 || Socorro || LINEAR || AER || align=right | 1.8 km || 
|-id=877 bgcolor=#E9E9E9
| 230877 ||  || — || September 11, 2004 || Socorro || LINEAR || — || align=right | 3.1 km || 
|-id=878 bgcolor=#fefefe
| 230878 ||  || — || September 10, 2004 || Kitt Peak || Spacewatch || — || align=right data-sort-value="0.92" | 920 m || 
|-id=879 bgcolor=#fefefe
| 230879 ||  || — || September 6, 2004 || Palomar || NEAT || — || align=right | 2.9 km || 
|-id=880 bgcolor=#E9E9E9
| 230880 ||  || — || September 6, 2004 || Palomar || NEAT || — || align=right | 3.4 km || 
|-id=881 bgcolor=#E9E9E9
| 230881 ||  || — || September 12, 2004 || Kitt Peak || Spacewatch || — || align=right | 1.4 km || 
|-id=882 bgcolor=#E9E9E9
| 230882 ||  || — || September 12, 2004 || Socorro || LINEAR || — || align=right | 2.3 km || 
|-id=883 bgcolor=#E9E9E9
| 230883 ||  || — || September 11, 2004 || Palomar || NEAT || — || align=right | 2.8 km || 
|-id=884 bgcolor=#E9E9E9
| 230884 ||  || — || September 13, 2004 || Socorro || LINEAR || — || align=right | 1.5 km || 
|-id=885 bgcolor=#E9E9E9
| 230885 ||  || — || September 15, 2004 || Kitt Peak || Spacewatch || — || align=right | 2.1 km || 
|-id=886 bgcolor=#E9E9E9
| 230886 ||  || — || September 7, 2004 || Socorro || LINEAR || — || align=right | 1.6 km || 
|-id=887 bgcolor=#E9E9E9
| 230887 ||  || — || September 8, 2004 || Socorro || LINEAR || — || align=right | 2.6 km || 
|-id=888 bgcolor=#E9E9E9
| 230888 ||  || — || September 16, 2004 || Siding Spring || SSS || — || align=right | 2.0 km || 
|-id=889 bgcolor=#E9E9E9
| 230889 ||  || — || September 16, 2004 || Socorro || LINEAR || BRU || align=right | 6.2 km || 
|-id=890 bgcolor=#E9E9E9
| 230890 ||  || — || September 17, 2004 || Socorro || LINEAR || — || align=right | 2.0 km || 
|-id=891 bgcolor=#E9E9E9
| 230891 ||  || — || September 17, 2004 || Socorro || LINEAR || — || align=right | 4.2 km || 
|-id=892 bgcolor=#fefefe
| 230892 ||  || — || September 22, 2004 || Socorro || LINEAR || — || align=right | 1.6 km || 
|-id=893 bgcolor=#E9E9E9
| 230893 ||  || — || October 4, 2004 || Kitt Peak || Spacewatch || — || align=right | 3.5 km || 
|-id=894 bgcolor=#d6d6d6
| 230894 ||  || — || October 4, 2004 || Kitt Peak || Spacewatch || HYG || align=right | 4.2 km || 
|-id=895 bgcolor=#E9E9E9
| 230895 ||  || — || October 7, 2004 || Goodricke-Pigott || R. A. Tucker || NEM || align=right | 3.6 km || 
|-id=896 bgcolor=#E9E9E9
| 230896 ||  || — || October 12, 2004 || Goodricke-Pigott || R. A. Tucker || — || align=right | 3.3 km || 
|-id=897 bgcolor=#d6d6d6
| 230897 ||  || — || October 4, 2004 || Kitt Peak || Spacewatch || — || align=right | 3.4 km || 
|-id=898 bgcolor=#E9E9E9
| 230898 ||  || — || October 4, 2004 || Kitt Peak || Spacewatch || — || align=right | 1.4 km || 
|-id=899 bgcolor=#fefefe
| 230899 ||  || — || October 4, 2004 || Kitt Peak || Spacewatch || MAS || align=right | 1.2 km || 
|-id=900 bgcolor=#E9E9E9
| 230900 ||  || — || October 5, 2004 || Kitt Peak || Spacewatch || — || align=right | 2.9 km || 
|}

230901–231000 

|-bgcolor=#E9E9E9
| 230901 ||  || — || October 5, 2004 || Kitt Peak || Spacewatch || — || align=right | 2.5 km || 
|-id=902 bgcolor=#E9E9E9
| 230902 ||  || — || October 5, 2004 || Anderson Mesa || LONEOS || — || align=right | 3.6 km || 
|-id=903 bgcolor=#E9E9E9
| 230903 ||  || — || October 5, 2004 || Palomar || NEAT || WIT || align=right | 1.6 km || 
|-id=904 bgcolor=#E9E9E9
| 230904 ||  || — || October 6, 2004 || Kitt Peak || Spacewatch || — || align=right | 1.2 km || 
|-id=905 bgcolor=#E9E9E9
| 230905 ||  || — || October 5, 2004 || Kitt Peak || Spacewatch || — || align=right | 1.2 km || 
|-id=906 bgcolor=#E9E9E9
| 230906 ||  || — || October 5, 2004 || Anderson Mesa || LONEOS || — || align=right | 1.7 km || 
|-id=907 bgcolor=#E9E9E9
| 230907 ||  || — || October 5, 2004 || Anderson Mesa || LONEOS || — || align=right | 3.5 km || 
|-id=908 bgcolor=#E9E9E9
| 230908 ||  || — || October 8, 2004 || Socorro || LINEAR || — || align=right | 2.3 km || 
|-id=909 bgcolor=#E9E9E9
| 230909 ||  || — || October 9, 2004 || Socorro || LINEAR || — || align=right | 2.3 km || 
|-id=910 bgcolor=#E9E9E9
| 230910 ||  || — || October 7, 2004 || Kitt Peak || Spacewatch || — || align=right | 1.7 km || 
|-id=911 bgcolor=#E9E9E9
| 230911 ||  || — || October 7, 2004 || Kitt Peak || Spacewatch || — || align=right | 1.9 km || 
|-id=912 bgcolor=#E9E9E9
| 230912 ||  || — || October 7, 2004 || Socorro || LINEAR || MAR || align=right | 1.8 km || 
|-id=913 bgcolor=#E9E9E9
| 230913 ||  || — || October 6, 2004 || Socorro || LINEAR || — || align=right | 3.0 km || 
|-id=914 bgcolor=#E9E9E9
| 230914 ||  || — || October 9, 2004 || Socorro || LINEAR || — || align=right | 3.8 km || 
|-id=915 bgcolor=#E9E9E9
| 230915 ||  || — || October 9, 2004 || Kitt Peak || Spacewatch || — || align=right | 1.8 km || 
|-id=916 bgcolor=#E9E9E9
| 230916 ||  || — || October 9, 2004 || Kitt Peak || Spacewatch || XIZ || align=right | 2.1 km || 
|-id=917 bgcolor=#E9E9E9
| 230917 ||  || — || October 9, 2004 || Kitt Peak || Spacewatch || XIZ || align=right | 1.6 km || 
|-id=918 bgcolor=#E9E9E9
| 230918 ||  || — || October 8, 2004 || Socorro || LINEAR || — || align=right | 2.1 km || 
|-id=919 bgcolor=#E9E9E9
| 230919 ||  || — || October 8, 2004 || Socorro || LINEAR || — || align=right | 3.8 km || 
|-id=920 bgcolor=#E9E9E9
| 230920 ||  || — || October 11, 2004 || Kitt Peak || Spacewatch || HEN || align=right | 1.6 km || 
|-id=921 bgcolor=#d6d6d6
| 230921 ||  || — || October 7, 2004 || Kitt Peak || Spacewatch || — || align=right | 3.2 km || 
|-id=922 bgcolor=#E9E9E9
| 230922 ||  || — || October 7, 2004 || Socorro || LINEAR || — || align=right | 3.7 km || 
|-id=923 bgcolor=#E9E9E9
| 230923 ||  || — || October 14, 2004 || Anderson Mesa || LONEOS || MAR || align=right | 1.7 km || 
|-id=924 bgcolor=#d6d6d6
| 230924 ||  || — || October 15, 2004 || Socorro || LINEAR || — || align=right | 4.3 km || 
|-id=925 bgcolor=#E9E9E9
| 230925 ||  || — || October 8, 2004 || Kitt Peak || Spacewatch || — || align=right | 2.2 km || 
|-id=926 bgcolor=#E9E9E9
| 230926 ||  || — || October 23, 2004 || Socorro || LINEAR || — || align=right | 2.0 km || 
|-id=927 bgcolor=#E9E9E9
| 230927 ||  || — || November 4, 2004 || Catalina || CSS || — || align=right | 3.3 km || 
|-id=928 bgcolor=#E9E9E9
| 230928 ||  || — || November 3, 2004 || Catalina || CSS || — || align=right | 3.4 km || 
|-id=929 bgcolor=#E9E9E9
| 230929 ||  || — || November 10, 2004 || Desert Eagle || W. K. Y. Yeung || GEF || align=right | 1.8 km || 
|-id=930 bgcolor=#E9E9E9
| 230930 ||  || — || November 4, 2004 || Catalina || CSS || WIT || align=right | 1.6 km || 
|-id=931 bgcolor=#d6d6d6
| 230931 ||  || — || November 5, 2004 || Palomar || NEAT || — || align=right | 4.5 km || 
|-id=932 bgcolor=#E9E9E9
| 230932 ||  || — || November 2, 2004 || Anderson Mesa || LONEOS || — || align=right | 3.2 km || 
|-id=933 bgcolor=#E9E9E9
| 230933 ||  || — || November 10, 2004 || Kitt Peak || Spacewatch || — || align=right | 3.8 km || 
|-id=934 bgcolor=#d6d6d6
| 230934 ||  || — || November 19, 2004 || Socorro || LINEAR || — || align=right | 5.3 km || 
|-id=935 bgcolor=#E9E9E9
| 230935 ||  || — || November 19, 2004 || Catalina || CSS || AGN || align=right | 1.7 km || 
|-id=936 bgcolor=#E9E9E9
| 230936 ||  || — || December 1, 2004 || Catalina || CSS || GEF || align=right | 2.0 km || 
|-id=937 bgcolor=#E9E9E9
| 230937 ||  || — || December 1, 2004 || Catalina || CSS || CLO || align=right | 3.4 km || 
|-id=938 bgcolor=#d6d6d6
| 230938 ||  || — || December 2, 2004 || Socorro || LINEAR || HYG || align=right | 5.7 km || 
|-id=939 bgcolor=#E9E9E9
| 230939 ||  || — || December 2, 2004 || Palomar || NEAT || — || align=right | 2.7 km || 
|-id=940 bgcolor=#d6d6d6
| 230940 ||  || — || December 3, 2004 || Kitt Peak || Spacewatch || KOR || align=right | 2.5 km || 
|-id=941 bgcolor=#E9E9E9
| 230941 ||  || — || December 8, 2004 || Socorro || LINEAR || — || align=right | 4.0 km || 
|-id=942 bgcolor=#E9E9E9
| 230942 ||  || — || December 10, 2004 || Socorro || LINEAR || — || align=right | 3.3 km || 
|-id=943 bgcolor=#d6d6d6
| 230943 ||  || — || December 10, 2004 || Socorro || LINEAR || THM || align=right | 4.2 km || 
|-id=944 bgcolor=#E9E9E9
| 230944 ||  || — || December 11, 2004 || Kitt Peak || Spacewatch || NEM || align=right | 3.0 km || 
|-id=945 bgcolor=#E9E9E9
| 230945 ||  || — || December 11, 2004 || Campo Imperatore || CINEOS || — || align=right | 2.2 km || 
|-id=946 bgcolor=#E9E9E9
| 230946 ||  || — || December 9, 2004 || Kitt Peak || Spacewatch || — || align=right | 4.6 km || 
|-id=947 bgcolor=#E9E9E9
| 230947 ||  || — || December 10, 2004 || Socorro || LINEAR || — || align=right | 2.7 km || 
|-id=948 bgcolor=#d6d6d6
| 230948 ||  || — || December 10, 2004 || Kitt Peak || Spacewatch || — || align=right | 4.0 km || 
|-id=949 bgcolor=#E9E9E9
| 230949 ||  || — || December 7, 2004 || Socorro || LINEAR || — || align=right | 2.8 km || 
|-id=950 bgcolor=#d6d6d6
| 230950 ||  || — || December 10, 2004 || Socorro || LINEAR || — || align=right | 5.3 km || 
|-id=951 bgcolor=#E9E9E9
| 230951 ||  || — || December 11, 2004 || Kitt Peak || Spacewatch || — || align=right | 4.8 km || 
|-id=952 bgcolor=#E9E9E9
| 230952 ||  || — || December 9, 2004 || Catalina || CSS || — || align=right | 2.6 km || 
|-id=953 bgcolor=#E9E9E9
| 230953 ||  || — || December 11, 2004 || Kitt Peak || Spacewatch || WIT || align=right | 1.7 km || 
|-id=954 bgcolor=#E9E9E9
| 230954 ||  || — || December 11, 2004 || Kitt Peak || Spacewatch || HNA || align=right | 3.9 km || 
|-id=955 bgcolor=#E9E9E9
| 230955 ||  || — || December 10, 2004 || Kitt Peak || Spacewatch || WIT || align=right | 1.3 km || 
|-id=956 bgcolor=#E9E9E9
| 230956 ||  || — || December 10, 2004 || Kitt Peak || Spacewatch || HOF || align=right | 3.6 km || 
|-id=957 bgcolor=#E9E9E9
| 230957 ||  || — || December 14, 2004 || Socorro || LINEAR || — || align=right | 4.3 km || 
|-id=958 bgcolor=#E9E9E9
| 230958 ||  || — || December 14, 2004 || Socorro || LINEAR || — || align=right | 3.3 km || 
|-id=959 bgcolor=#E9E9E9
| 230959 ||  || — || December 15, 2004 || Socorro || LINEAR || HOF || align=right | 5.0 km || 
|-id=960 bgcolor=#E9E9E9
| 230960 ||  || — || December 15, 2004 || Catalina || CSS || — || align=right | 2.5 km || 
|-id=961 bgcolor=#d6d6d6
| 230961 ||  || — || December 10, 2004 || Kitt Peak || Spacewatch || — || align=right | 4.8 km || 
|-id=962 bgcolor=#d6d6d6
| 230962 ||  || — || December 11, 2004 || Kitt Peak || Spacewatch || — || align=right | 5.9 km || 
|-id=963 bgcolor=#E9E9E9
| 230963 ||  || — || December 2, 2004 || Anderson Mesa || LONEOS || — || align=right | 2.6 km || 
|-id=964 bgcolor=#d6d6d6
| 230964 ||  || — || December 11, 2004 || Kitt Peak || Spacewatch || — || align=right | 4.5 km || 
|-id=965 bgcolor=#C2E0FF
| 230965 ||  || — || December 12, 2004 || Palomar || Palomar Obs. || other TNO || align=right | 603 km || 
|-id=966 bgcolor=#d6d6d6
| 230966 ||  || — || December 18, 2004 || Mount Lemmon || Mount Lemmon Survey || — || align=right | 3.1 km || 
|-id=967 bgcolor=#d6d6d6
| 230967 ||  || — || December 18, 2004 || Mount Lemmon || Mount Lemmon Survey || ELF || align=right | 6.3 km || 
|-id=968 bgcolor=#d6d6d6
| 230968 ||  || — || December 18, 2004 || Mount Lemmon || Mount Lemmon Survey || — || align=right | 3.5 km || 
|-id=969 bgcolor=#d6d6d6
| 230969 ||  || — || December 18, 2004 || Mount Lemmon || Mount Lemmon Survey || EOS || align=right | 2.4 km || 
|-id=970 bgcolor=#d6d6d6
| 230970 ||  || — || December 18, 2004 || Kitt Peak || Spacewatch || — || align=right | 5.9 km || 
|-id=971 bgcolor=#d6d6d6
| 230971 ||  || — || January 6, 2005 || Catalina || CSS || TIR || align=right | 5.0 km || 
|-id=972 bgcolor=#fefefe
| 230972 ||  || — || January 6, 2005 || Catalina || CSS || H || align=right data-sort-value="0.99" | 990 m || 
|-id=973 bgcolor=#d6d6d6
| 230973 ||  || — || January 6, 2005 || Catalina || CSS || — || align=right | 4.8 km || 
|-id=974 bgcolor=#E9E9E9
| 230974 ||  || — || January 6, 2005 || Socorro || LINEAR || AGN || align=right | 1.7 km || 
|-id=975 bgcolor=#E9E9E9
| 230975 Rogerfederer ||  ||  || January 10, 2005 || Vicques || M. Ory || — || align=right | 3.8 km || 
|-id=976 bgcolor=#E9E9E9
| 230976 ||  || — || January 10, 2005 || Kitami || K. Endate || — || align=right | 3.2 km || 
|-id=977 bgcolor=#fefefe
| 230977 ||  || — || January 11, 2005 || Socorro || LINEAR || H || align=right | 1.3 km || 
|-id=978 bgcolor=#d6d6d6
| 230978 ||  || — || January 15, 2005 || Socorro || LINEAR || — || align=right | 3.8 km || 
|-id=979 bgcolor=#FFC2E0
| 230979 ||  || — || January 15, 2005 || Anderson Mesa || LONEOS || AMO +1km || align=right | 1.5 km || 
|-id=980 bgcolor=#E9E9E9
| 230980 ||  || — || January 13, 2005 || Jarnac || Jarnac Obs. || — || align=right | 3.1 km || 
|-id=981 bgcolor=#d6d6d6
| 230981 ||  || — || January 15, 2005 || Kitt Peak || Spacewatch || ALA || align=right | 6.5 km || 
|-id=982 bgcolor=#d6d6d6
| 230982 ||  || — || January 15, 2005 || Kitt Peak || Spacewatch || — || align=right | 2.7 km || 
|-id=983 bgcolor=#d6d6d6
| 230983 ||  || — || January 15, 2005 || Kitt Peak || Spacewatch || — || align=right | 4.3 km || 
|-id=984 bgcolor=#d6d6d6
| 230984 ||  || — || January 15, 2005 || Kitt Peak || Spacewatch || — || align=right | 3.8 km || 
|-id=985 bgcolor=#d6d6d6
| 230985 ||  || — || January 16, 2005 || Socorro || LINEAR || — || align=right | 4.1 km || 
|-id=986 bgcolor=#fefefe
| 230986 ||  || — || January 31, 2005 || Socorro || LINEAR || H || align=right | 1.0 km || 
|-id=987 bgcolor=#d6d6d6
| 230987 ||  || — || January 17, 2005 || Catalina || CSS || ALA || align=right | 6.3 km || 
|-id=988 bgcolor=#d6d6d6
| 230988 ||  || — || February 1, 2005 || Kitt Peak || Spacewatch || TIR || align=right | 2.7 km || 
|-id=989 bgcolor=#d6d6d6
| 230989 ||  || — || February 1, 2005 || Kitt Peak || Spacewatch || EOS || align=right | 3.7 km || 
|-id=990 bgcolor=#d6d6d6
| 230990 ||  || — || February 2, 2005 || Kitt Peak || Spacewatch || EOS || align=right | 3.2 km || 
|-id=991 bgcolor=#d6d6d6
| 230991 ||  || — || February 2, 2005 || Kitt Peak || Spacewatch || — || align=right | 3.2 km || 
|-id=992 bgcolor=#d6d6d6
| 230992 ||  || — || February 2, 2005 || Kitt Peak || Spacewatch || — || align=right | 2.9 km || 
|-id=993 bgcolor=#d6d6d6
| 230993 ||  || — || February 2, 2005 || Catalina || CSS || — || align=right | 3.2 km || 
|-id=994 bgcolor=#d6d6d6
| 230994 ||  || — || February 2, 2005 || Socorro || LINEAR || LIX || align=right | 4.9 km || 
|-id=995 bgcolor=#d6d6d6
| 230995 ||  || — || February 2, 2005 || Socorro || LINEAR || — || align=right | 5.3 km || 
|-id=996 bgcolor=#d6d6d6
| 230996 ||  || — || February 2, 2005 || Kitt Peak || Spacewatch || — || align=right | 3.3 km || 
|-id=997 bgcolor=#d6d6d6
| 230997 ||  || — || February 9, 2005 || Kitt Peak || Spacewatch || — || align=right | 2.9 km || 
|-id=998 bgcolor=#d6d6d6
| 230998 ||  || — || February 9, 2005 || Kitt Peak || Spacewatch || — || align=right | 4.8 km || 
|-id=999 bgcolor=#d6d6d6
| 230999 ||  || — || February 9, 2005 || Kitt Peak || Spacewatch || EOS || align=right | 2.6 km || 
|-id=000 bgcolor=#d6d6d6
| 231000 ||  || — || February 1, 2005 || Catalina || CSS || EOS || align=right | 2.7 km || 
|}

References

External links 
 Discovery Circumstances: Numbered Minor Planets (230001)–(235000) (IAU Minor Planet Center)

0230